= Backscatter =

Reflection which reverses the direction of a wave, particle, or signal

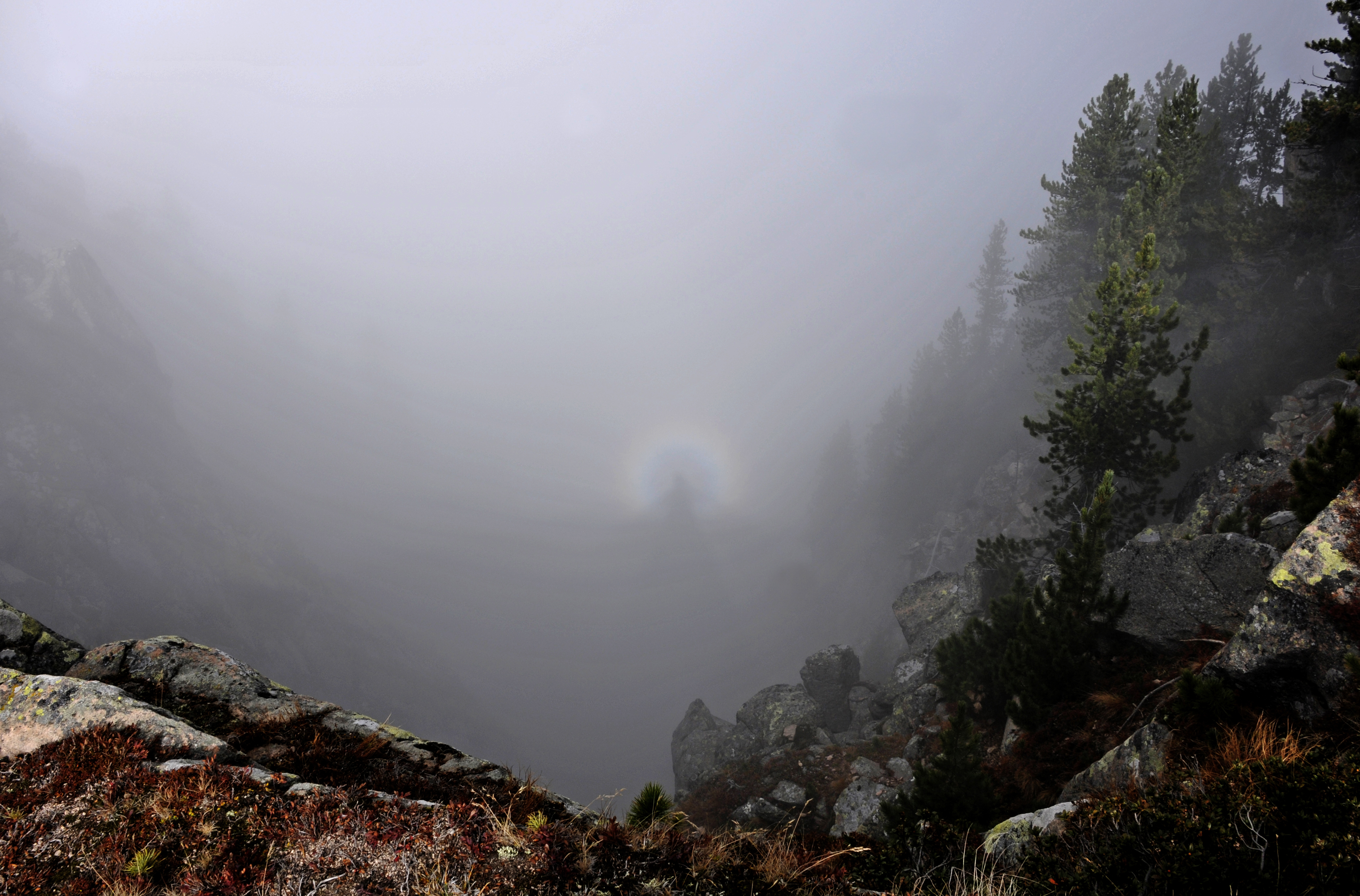
Backscatter in photography, showing a Brocken spectre within the rings of a glory

In physics, backscatter (or backscattering) is the reflection of waves, particles, or signals back to the direction from which they came. It is usually a diffuse reflection due to scattering, as opposed to specular reflection as from a mirror, although specular backscattering can occur at normal incidence with a surface. Backscattering has important applications in astronomy, photography, and medical ultrasonography. The opposite effect is forward scatter, e.g. when a translucent material like a cloud diffuses sunlight, giving soft light.

== Backscatter of waves in physical space ==
Backscattering can occur in quite different physical situations, where the incoming waves or particles are deflected from their original direction by different mechanisms:

- Diffuse reflection from large particles and Mie scattering, causing alpenglow and gegenschein, and showing up in weather radar;
- Inelastic collisions between electromagnetic waves and the transmitting medium (Brillouin scattering and Raman scattering), important in fiber optics, see below;
- Elastic collisions between accelerated ions and a sample (Rutherford backscattering)
- Bragg diffraction from crystals, used in inelastic scattering experiments (neutron backscattering, X-ray backscattering spectroscopy);
- Compton scattering, used in Backscatter X-ray imaging.
- Stimulated backscatter, observed in non-linear optics, and described by a class of solutions to the three-wave equation.

Sometimes, the scattering is more or less isotropic, i.e. the incoming particles are scattered randomly in various directions, with no particular preference for backward scattering. In these cases, the term "backscattering" just designates the detector location chosen for some practical reasons:

- in X-ray imaging, backscattering means just the opposite of transmission imaging;
- in inelastic neutron or X-ray spectroscopy, backscattering geometry is chosen because it optimizes the energy resolution;
- in astronomy, backscattered light is that which is reflected with a phase angle of less than 90°.

In other cases, the scattering intensity is enhanced in backward direction. This can have different reasons:

- In alpenglow, red light prevails because the blue part of the spectrum is depleted by Rayleigh scattering.
- In gegenschein, constructive interference might play a role.
- Coherent backscattering is observed in random media; for visible light most typically in suspensions like milk. Due to weak localization, enhanced multiple scattering is observed in back direction.
  - The Back Scattering Alignment (BSA) coordinate system is often used in radar applications
  - The Forward Scattering Alignment (FSA) coordinate system is primarily used in optical applications

Backscattering properties of a target are wavelength dependent and can also be polarization dependent. Sensor systems using multiple wavelengths or polarizations can thus be used to infer additional information about target properties.

=== Radar, especially weather radar ===
Backscattering is the principle behind radar systems. In weather radar, backscattering is proportional to the 6th power of the diameter of the target multiplied by its inherent reflective properties, provided the wavelength is larger than the particle diameter (Rayleigh scattering). Water is almost 4 times more reflective than ice but droplets are much smaller than snow flakes or hail stones. So the backscattering is dependent on a mix of these two factors. The strongest backscatter comes from hail and large graupel (solid ice) due to their sizes, but non-Rayleigh (Mie scattering) effects can confuse interpretation. Another strong return is from melting snow or wet sleet, as they combine size and water reflectivity. They often show up as much higher rates of precipitation than actually occurring in what is called a brightband. Rain is a moderate backscatter, being stronger with large drops (such as from a thunderstorm) and much weaker with small droplets (such as mist or drizzle). Snow has rather weak backscatter. Dual polarization weather radars measure backscatter at horizontal and vertical polarizations to infer shape information from the ratio of the vertical and horizontal signals.

== In waveguides ==
The backscattering method is also employed in fiber optics applications to detect optical faults. Light propagating through a fiber-optic cable gradually attenuates due to Rayleigh scattering. Faults are thus detected by monitoring the variation of part of the Rayleigh backscattered light. Since the backscattered light attenuates exponentially as it travels along the optical fiber cable, the attenuation characteristic is represented in a logarithmic scale graph. If the slope of the graph is steep, then power loss is high. If the slope is gentle, then optical fiber has a satisfactory loss characteristic.

The loss measurement by the backscattering method allows measurement of a fiber-optic cable at one end without cutting the optical fiber hence it can be conveniently used for the construction and maintenance of optical fibers.

== In photography ==
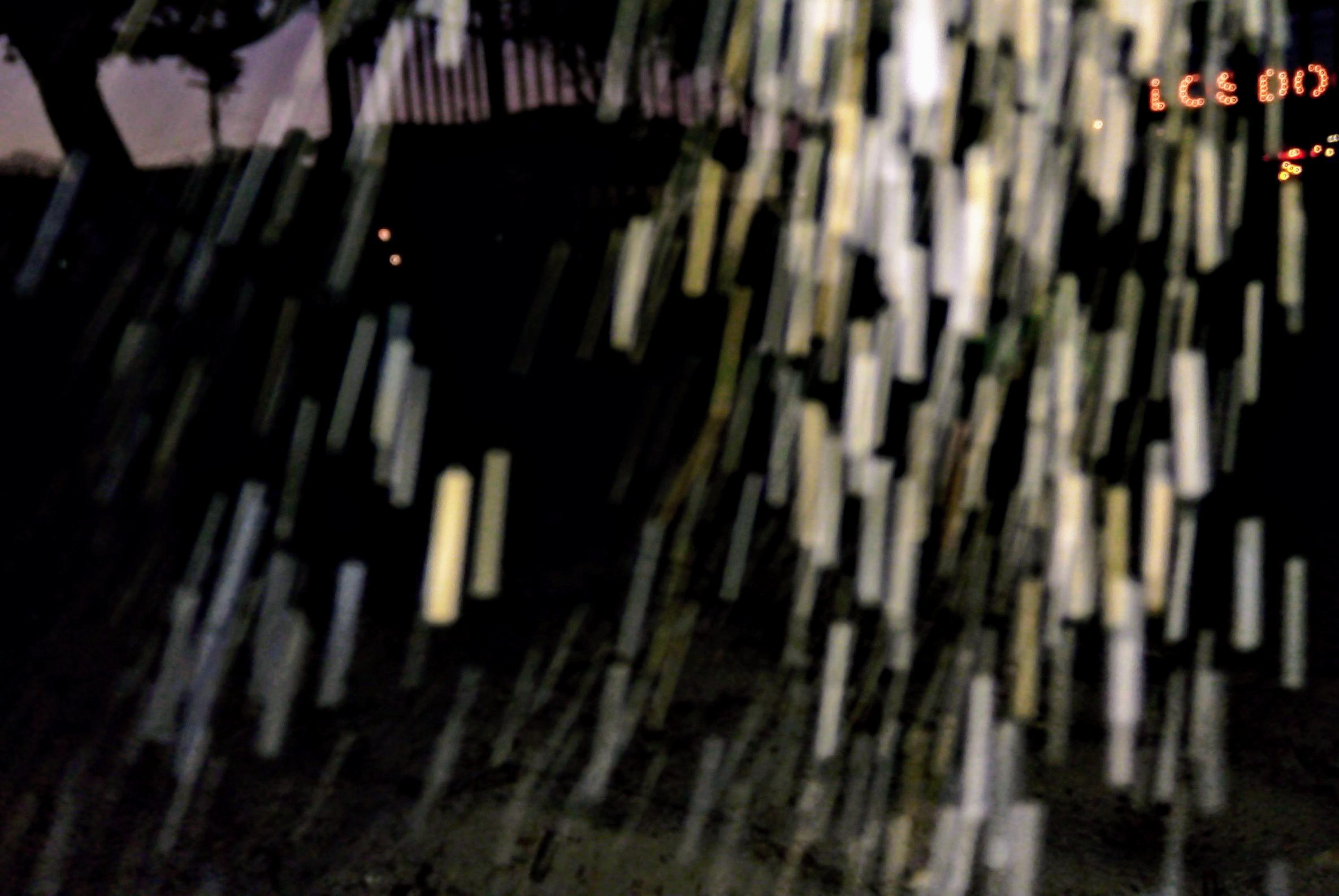
Light from a smartphone flash reflecting off of sand particles.

The term backscatter in photography refers to light from flash, strobe, or video lights reflecting back from particles in the lens's field of view, causing specks of light to appear in the photo. This gives rise to what are sometimes referred to as orb artifacts. Photographic backscatter can result from snowflakes, rain or mist, or airborne dust. Due to the size limitations of the modern compact and ultra-compact cameras, especially digital cameras, the distance between the lens and the built-in flash has decreased, thereby decreasing the angle of light reflection to the lens and increasing the likelihood of light reflection off normally sub-visible particles. Hence, the orb artifact is commonplace with small digital or film camera photographs.

== See also ==
- Backscatter (email)
- Backscatter X-ray (in security scanning applications, e.g. at airports)
- Forward scattering
- Scattering
- Electron backscatter diffraction
