= Coherent backscattering =

Scattering of a radiation wave as it travels through a complex medium

In physics, coherent backscattering is observed when coherent radiation (such as a laser beam) propagates through a medium which has a large number of scattering centers (such as milk or a thick cloud) of size comparable to the wavelength of the radiation.

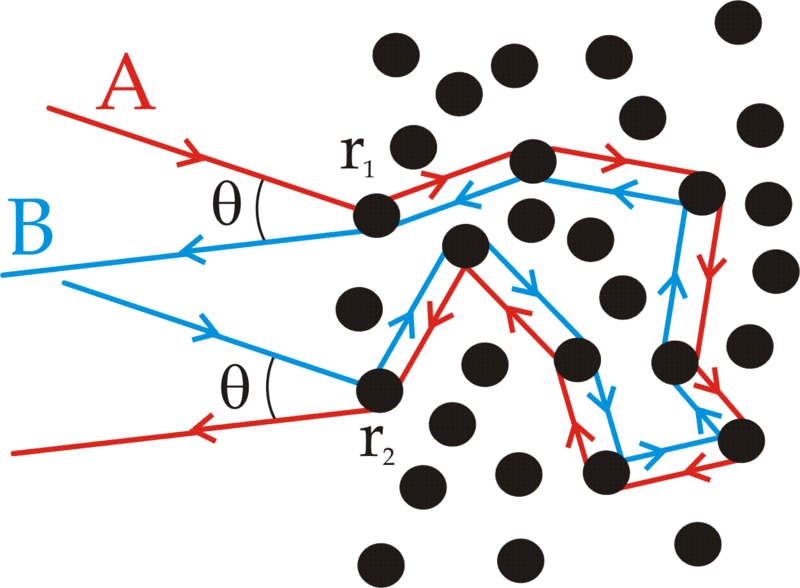
Propagation of two rays in a random medium. Since one can be obtained from the other by time inversion, they interfere coherently when the angle θ goes to zero.

The waves are scattered many times while traveling through the medium. Even for incoherent radiation, the scattering typically reaches a local maximum in the direction of backscattering. For coherent radiation, however, the peak is two times higher.

Coherent backscattering is very difficult to detect and measure for two reasons. The first is fairly obvious, that it is difficult to measure the direct backscatter without blocking the beam, but there are methods for overcoming this problem. The second is that the peak is usually extremely sharp around the backward direction, so that a very high level of angular resolution is needed for the detector to see the peak without averaging its intensity out over the surrounding angles where the intensity can undergo large dips. At angles other than the backscatter direction, the light intensity is subject to numerous essentially random fluctuations called speckles.

This is one of the most robust interference phenomena that survives multiple scattering, and it is regarded as an aspect of a quantum mechanical phenomenon known as weak localization (Akkermans et al. 1986). In weak localization, interference of the direct and reverse paths leads to a net reduction of light transport in the forward direction. This phenomenon is typical of any coherent wave which is multiple scattered. It is typically discussed for light waves, for which it is similar to the weak localization phenomenon for electrons in disordered semi-conductors and often seen as the precursor to Anderson (or strong) localization of light. Weak localization of light can be detected since it is manifested as an enhancement of light intensity in the backscattering direction. This substantial enhancement is called the cone of coherent backscattering.

Coherent backscattering has its origin in the interference between direct and reverse paths in the backscattering direction. When a multiply scattering medium is illuminated by a laser beam, the scattered intensity results from the interference between the amplitudes associated with the various scattering paths; for a disordered medium, the interference terms are washed out when averaged over many sample configurations, except in a narrow angular range around exact backscattering where the average intensity is enhanced. This phenomenon is the result of many sinusoidal two-wave interference patterns which add up. The cone is the Fourier transform of the spatial distribution of the intensity of the scattered light on the sample surface, when the latter is illuminated by a point-like source. The enhanced backscattering relies on the constructive interference between reverse paths. One can make an analogy with a Young's interference experiment, where two diffracting slits would be positioned in place of the "input" and "output" scatterers.

== See also ==
- Back scattering alignment (BSA), a coordinate system most commonly used in radar
- Forward scattering alignment (FSA), a coordinate system primarily used in optics
- Opposition surge, an astronomical phenomenon caused by the coherent backscatter effect
