= Modal matrix =

In linear algebra, the modal matrix is used in the diagonalization process involving eigenvalues and eigenvectors.

Specifically the modal matrix $M$ for the matrix $A$ is the n × n matrix formed with the eigenvectors of $A$ as columns in $M$. It is utilized in the similarity transformation

$$D = M^{-1}AM,$$

where $D$ is an n × n diagonal matrix with the eigenvalues of $A$ on the main diagonal of $D$ and zeros elsewhere. The matrix $D$ is called the spectral matrix for $A$. The eigenvalues must appear left to right, top to bottom in the same order as their corresponding eigenvectors are arranged left to right in $M$.

== Example ==
The matrix

$$A = \begin{pmatrix}
3 & 2 & 0 \\
2 & 0 & 0 \\
1 & 0 & 2
\end{pmatrix}$$

has eigenvalues and corresponding eigenvectors

$$\lambda_1 = -1, \quad \, \mathbf b_1 = \left( -3, 6, 1 \right) ,$$
$$\lambda_2 = 2, \qquad \mathbf b_2 = \left( 0, 0, 1 \right) ,$$
$$\lambda_3 = 4, \qquad \mathbf b_3 = \left( 2, 1, 1 \right) .$$

A diagonal matrix $D$, similar to $A$ is

$$D = \begin{pmatrix}
-1 & 0 & 0 \\
0 & 2 & 0 \\
0 & 0 & 4
\end{pmatrix}.$$

One possible choice for an invertible matrix $M$ such that $D = M^{-1}AM,$ is

$$M = \begin{pmatrix}
-3 & 0 & 2 \\
6 & 0 & 1 \\
1 & 1 & 1
\end{pmatrix}.$$

Note that since eigenvectors themselves are not unique, and since the columns of both $M$ and $D$ may be interchanged, it follows that both $M$ and $D$ are not unique.

== Generalized modal matrix ==
Let $A$ be an n × n matrix. A generalized modal matrix $M$ for $A$ is an n × n matrix whose columns, considered as vectors, form a canonical basis for $A$ and appear in $M$ according to the following rules:

- All Jordan chains consisting of one vector (that is, one vector in length) appear in the first columns of $M$.
- All vectors of one chain appear together in adjacent columns of $M$.
- Each chain appears in $M$ in order of increasing rank (that is, the generalized eigenvector of rank 1 appears before the generalized eigenvector of rank 2 of the same chain, which appears before the generalized eigenvector of rank 3 of the same chain, etc.).

One can show that

| $AM = MJ,$ | 1 |

where $J$ is a matrix in Jordan normal form. By premultiplying by $M^{-1}$, we obtain

| $J = M^{-1}AM.$ | 2 |

Note that when computing these matrices, equation (1) is the easiest of the two equations to verify, since it does not require inverting a matrix.

=== Example ===
This example illustrates a generalized modal matrix with four Jordan chains. Unfortunately, it is a little difficult to construct an interesting example of low order. The matrix

$$A = \begin{pmatrix}
-1 &  0 & -1 &  1 &  1 &  3 &  0 \\
0 &  1 &  0 &  0 &  0 &  0 &  0 \\
2 &  1 &  2 & -1 & -1 & -6 &  0 \\
-2 &  0 & -1 &  2 &  1 &  3 &  0 \\
0 &  0 &  0 &  0 &  1 &  0 &  0 \\
0 &  0 &  0 &  0 &  0 &  1 &  0 \\
-1 & -1 &  0 &  1 &  2 &  4 &  1
\end{pmatrix}$$

has a single eigenvalue $\lambda_1 = 1$ with algebraic multiplicity $\mu_1 = 7$. A canonical basis for $A$ will consist of one linearly independent generalized eigenvector of rank 3 (generalized eigenvector rank; see generalized eigenvector), two of rank 2 and four of rank 1; or equivalently, one chain of three vectors $\left\{ \mathbf x_3, \mathbf x_2, \mathbf x_1 \right\}$, one chain of two vectors $\left\{ \mathbf y_2, \mathbf y_1 \right\}$, and two chains of one vector $\left\{ \mathbf z_1 \right\}$, $\left\{ \mathbf w_1 \right\}$.

An "almost diagonal" matrix $J$ in Jordan normal form, similar to $A$ is obtained as follows:

$$M =
\begin{pmatrix} \mathbf z_1 & \mathbf w_1 & \mathbf x_1 & \mathbf x_2 & \mathbf x_3 & \mathbf y_1 & \mathbf y_2 \end{pmatrix} =
\begin{pmatrix}
0 &  1 & -1 &  0 &  0 & -2 &  1 \\
0 &  3 &  0 &  0 &  1 &  0 &  0 \\
-1 &  1 &  1 &  1 &  0 &  2 &  0 \\
-2 &  0 & -1 &  0 &  0 & -2 &  0 \\
1 &  0 &  0 &  0 &  0 &  0 &  0 \\
0 &  1 &  0 &  0 &  0 &  0 &  0 \\
0 &  0 &  0 & -1 &  0 & -1 &  0
\end{pmatrix},$$

$$J = \begin{pmatrix}
1 &  0 &  0 &  0 &  0 &  0 &  0 \\
0 &  1 &  0 &  0 &  0 &  0 &  0 \\
0 &  0 &  1 &  1 &  0 &  0 &  0 \\
0 &  0 &  0 &  1 &  1 &  0 &  0 \\
0 &  0 &  0 &  0 &  1 &  0 &  0 \\
0 &  0 &  0 &  0 &  0 &  1 &  1 \\
0 &  0 &  0 &  0 &  0 &  0 &  1
\end{pmatrix},$$

where $M$ is a generalized modal matrix for $A$, the columns of $M$ are a canonical basis for $A$, and $AM = MJ$. Note that since generalized eigenvectors themselves are not unique, and since some of the columns of both $M$ and $J$ may be interchanged, it follows that both $M$ and $J$ are not unique.
