= Pseudo-determinant =

In linear algebra and statistics, the pseudo-determinant is the product of all non-zero eigenvalues of a square matrix. It coincides with the regular determinant when the matrix is non-singular.

== Definition ==
The pseudo-determinant of a square n-by-n matrix A may be defined as:

$$|\mathbf{A}|_+ = \lim_{\alpha\to 0} \frac{|\mathbf{A} + \alpha \mathbf{I}|}{\alpha^{n-\operatorname{rank}(\mathbf{A})}}$$

where |A| denotes the usual determinant, I denotes the identity matrix and rank(A) denotes the matrix rank of A.

== Definition of pseudo-determinant using Vahlen matrix ==
The Vahlen matrix of a conformal transformation, the Möbius transformation (i.e. $(ax + b)(cx + d)^{-1}$ for $a, b, c, d \in \mathcal{G}(p, q)$), is defined as
$$[f] = \begin{bmatrix}a & b \\c & d \end{bmatrix}$$
. By the pseudo-determinant of the Vahlen matrix for the conformal transformation, we mean

$$\operatorname{pdet} \begin{bmatrix}a & b\\ c& d\end{bmatrix} = ad^\dagger - bc^\dagger.$$

If $\operatorname{pdet}[f] > 0$, the transformation is sense-preserving (rotation) whereas if the $\operatorname{pdet}[f] < 0$, the transformation is sense-preserving (reflection).

== Computation for positive semi-definite case ==
If $A$ is positive semi-definite, then the singular values and eigenvalues of $A$ coincide. In this case, if the singular value decomposition (SVD) is available, then $|\mathbf{A}|_+$ may be computed as the product of the non-zero singular values. If all singular values are zero, then the pseudo-determinant is 1.

Supposing $\operatorname{rank}(A) = k$, so that k is the number of non-zero singular values, we may write $A = PP^\dagger$ where $P$ is some n-by-k matrix and the dagger is the conjugate transpose. The singular values of $A$ are the squares of the singular values of $P$ and thus we have $|A|_+ = \left|P^\dagger P\right|$, where $\left|P^\dagger P\right|$ is the usual determinant in k dimensions. Further, if $P$ is written as the block column $P = \left(\begin{smallmatrix} C \\ D \end{smallmatrix}\right)$, then it holds, for any heights of the blocks $C$ and $D$, that $|A|_+ = \left|C^\dagger C + D^\dagger D\right|$.

== Application in statistics ==
If a statistical procedure ordinarily compares distributions in terms of the determinants of variance-covariance matrices then, in the case of singular matrices, this comparison can be undertaken by using a combination of the ranks of the matrices and their pseudo-determinants, with the matrix of higher rank being counted as "largest" and the pseudo-determinants only being used if the ranks are equal. Thus pseudo-determinants are sometime presented in the outputs of statistical programs in cases where covariance matrices are singular. In particular, the normalization for a multivariate normal distribution with a covariance matrix Σ that is not necessarily nonsingular can be written as
$$\frac{1}{\sqrt{(2\pi)^{\operatorname{rank}(\mathbf\Sigma)}|\mathbf\Sigma|_+}} = \frac{1}{\sqrt{|2\pi\mathbf\Sigma|_+}}\,.$$

== See also ==
- Matrix determinant
- Moore–Penrose pseudoinverse, which can also be obtained in terms of the non-zero singular values.
