= Orthogonal diagonalization =

Method in linear algebra

In linear algebra, an orthogonal diagonalization of a normal matrix (e.g. a symmetric matrix) is a diagonalization by means of an orthogonal change of coordinates.

The following is an orthogonal diagonalization algorithm that diagonalizes a quadratic form q(x) on R^{n} by means of an orthogonal change of coordinates X = PY.

- Step 1: Find the symmetric matrix A that represents q and find its characteristic polynomial Δ(t).
- Step 2: Find the eigenvalues of A, which are the roots of Δ(t).
- Step 3: For each eigenvalue λ of A from step 2, find an orthogonal basis of its eigenspace.
- Step 4: Normalize all eigenvectors in step 3, which then form an orthonormal basis of R^{n}.
- Step 5: Let P be the matrix whose columns are the normalized eigenvectors in step 4.

Then X = PY is the required orthogonal change of coordinates, and the diagonal entries of P^{T}AP will be the eigenvalues λ_{1}, ..., λ_{n} that correspond to the columns of P.

Such decomposition exists by the spectral theorem.
