= Canonical basis =

Basis of a type of algebraic structure

In mathematics, a canonical basis is a basis of an algebraic structure that is canonical in a sense that depends on the precise context:

- In a coordinate space, and more generally in a free module, it refers to the standard basis defined by the Kronecker delta.
- In a polynomial ring, it refers to its standard basis given by the monomials, $(X^i)_i$.
- For finite extension fields, it means the polynomial basis.
- In linear algebra, it refers to a set of n linearly independent generalized eigenvectors of an n×n matrix $A$, if the set is composed entirely of Jordan chains.
- In representation theory, it refers to the basis of the quantum groups introduced by Lusztig.

== Representation theory ==
The canonical basis for the irreducible representations of a quantized enveloping algebra of type $ADE$ and also for the plus part of that algebra was introduced by Lusztig by two methods: an algebraic one (using a braid group action and PBW bases) and a topological one (using intersection cohomology). Specializing the parameter $q$ to $q=1$ yields a canonical basis for the irreducible representations of the corresponding simple Lie algebra, which was not known earlier. Specializing the parameter $q$ to $q=0$ yields something like a shadow of a basis. This shadow (but not the basis itself) for the case of irreducible representations was considered independently by Kashiwara; it is sometimes called the crystal basis. The definition of the canonical basis was extended to the Kac-Moody setting by Kashiwara (by an algebraic method) and by Lusztig (by a topological method).

There is a general concept underlying these bases:

Consider the ring of integral Laurent polynomials $\mathcal{Z}:=\mathbb{Z}\left[v,v^{-1}\right]$ with its two subrings $\mathcal{Z}^{\pm}:=\mathbb{Z}\left[v^{\pm 1}\right]$ and the automorphism $\overline{\cdot}$ defined by $\overline{v}:=v^{-1}$.

A precanonical structure on a free $\mathcal{Z}$-module $F$ consists of

- A standard basis $(t_i)_{i\in I}$ of $F$,
- An interval finite partial order on $I$, that is, $(-\infty,i] := \{j\in I \mid j\leq i\}$ is finite for all $i\in I$,
- A dualization operation, that is, a bijection $F\to F$ of order two that is $\overline{\cdot}$-semilinear and will be denoted by $\overline{\cdot}$ as well.

If a precanonical structure is given, then one can define the $\mathcal{Z}^{\pm}$ submodule $F^{\pm} := \sum \mathcal{Z}^{\pm} t_j$ of $F$.

A canonical basis of the precanonical structure is then a $\mathcal{Z}$-basis $(c_i)_{i\in I}$ of $F$ that satisfies:

- $\overline{c_i}=c_i$ and
- $c_i \in \sum_{j\leq i} \mathcal{Z}^+ t_j \text{ and } c_i \equiv t_i \mod vF^+$

for all $i\in I$.

One can show that there exists at most one canonical basis for each precanonical structure. A sufficient condition for existence is that the polynomials $r_{ij}\in\mathcal{Z}$ defined by $\overline{t_j}=\sum_i r_{ij} t_i$ satisfy $r_{ii}=1$ and $r_{ij}\neq 0 \implies i\leq j$.

A canonical basis induces an isomorphism from $\textstyle F^+\cap \overline{F^+} = \sum_i \mathbb{Z}c_i$ to $F^+/vF^+$.

=== Hecke algebras ===
Let $(W,S)$ be a Coxeter group. The corresponding Iwahori-Hecke algebra $H$ has the standard basis $(T_w)_{w\in W}$, the group is partially ordered by the Bruhat order which is interval finite and has a dualization operation defined by $\overline{T_w}:=T_{w^{-1}}^{-1}$. This is a precanonical structure on $H$ that satisfies the sufficient condition above and the corresponding canonical basis of $H$ is the Kazhdan–Lusztig basis

$$C_w' = \sum_{y\leq w} P_{y,w}(v^2) T_w$$

with $P_{y,w}$ being the Kazhdan–Lusztig polynomials.

== Linear algebra ==
If we are given an n × n matrix $A$ and wish to find a matrix $J$ in Jordan normal form, similar to $A$, we are interested only in sets of linearly independent generalized eigenvectors. A matrix in Jordan normal form is an "almost diagonal matrix," that is, as close to diagonal as possible. A diagonal matrix $D$ is a special case of a matrix in Jordan normal form. An ordinary eigenvector is a special case of a generalized eigenvector.

Every n × n matrix $A$ possesses n linearly independent generalized eigenvectors. Generalized eigenvectors corresponding to distinct eigenvalues are linearly independent. If $\lambda$ is an eigenvalue of $A$ of algebraic multiplicity $\mu$, then $A$ will have $\mu$ linearly independent generalized eigenvectors corresponding to $\lambda$.

For any given n × n matrix $A$, there are infinitely many ways to pick the n linearly independent generalized eigenvectors. If they are chosen in a particularly judicious manner, we can use these vectors to show that $A$ is similar to a matrix in Jordan normal form. In particular,

Definition: A set of n linearly independent generalized eigenvectors is a canonical basis if it is composed entirely of Jordan chains.

Thus, once we have determined that a generalized eigenvector of rank m is in a canonical basis, it follows that the m − 1 vectors $\mathbf x_{m-1}, \mathbf x_{m-2}, \ldots , \mathbf x_1$ that are in the Jordan chain generated by $\mathbf x_m$ are also in the canonical basis.

=== Computation ===
Let $\lambda_i$ be an eigenvalue of $A$ of algebraic multiplicity $\mu_i$. First, find the ranks (matrix ranks) of the matrices $(A - \lambda_i I), (A - \lambda_i I)^2, \ldots , (A - \lambda_i I)^{m_i}$. The integer $m_i$ is determined to be the first integer for which $(A - \lambda_i I)^{m_i}$ has rank $n - \mu_i$ (n being the number of rows or columns of $A$, that is, $A$ is n × n).

Now define

$$\rho_k = \operatorname{rank}(A - \lambda_i I)^{k-1} - \operatorname{rank}(A - \lambda_i I)^k \qquad (k = 1, 2, \ldots , m_i).$$

The variable $\rho_k$ designates the number of linearly independent generalized eigenvectors of rank k (generalized eigenvector rank; see generalized eigenvector) corresponding to the eigenvalue $\lambda_i$ that will appear in a canonical basis for $A$. Note that

$$\operatorname{rank}(A - \lambda_i I)^0 = \operatorname{rank}(I) = n .$$

Once we have determined the number of generalized eigenvectors of each rank that a canonical basis has, we can obtain the vectors explicitly (see generalized eigenvector).

=== Example ===
This example illustrates a canonical basis with two Jordan chains. Unfortunately, it is a little difficult to construct an interesting example of low order. The matrix

$$A = \begin{pmatrix}
4 & 1 & 1 & 0 & 0 & -1 \\
0 & 4 & 2 & 0 & 0 & 1 \\
0 & 0 & 4 & 1 & 0 & 0 \\
0 & 0 & 0 & 5 & 1 & 0 \\
0 & 0 & 0 & 0 & 5 & 2 \\
0 & 0 & 0 & 0 & 0 & 4
\end{pmatrix}$$

has eigenvalues $\lambda_1 = 4$ and $\lambda_2 = 5$ with algebraic multiplicities $\mu_1 = 4$ and $\mu_2 = 2$, but geometric multiplicities $\gamma_1 = 1$ and $\gamma_2 = 1$.

For $\lambda_1 = 4,$ we have $n - \mu_1 = 6 - 4 = 2,$

$(A - 4I)$ has rank 5,
$(A - 4I)^2$ has rank 4,
$(A - 4I)^3$ has rank 3,
$(A - 4I)^4$ has rank 2.

Therefore $m_1 = 4.$

$$\rho_4 = \operatorname{rank}(A - 4I)^3 - \operatorname{rank}(A - 4I)^4 = 3 - 2 = 1,$$
$$\rho_3 = \operatorname{rank}(A - 4I)^2 - \operatorname{rank}(A - 4I)^3 = 4 - 3 = 1,$$
$$\rho_2 = \operatorname{rank}(A - 4I)^1 - \operatorname{rank}(A - 4I)^2 = 5 - 4 = 1,$$
$$\rho_1 = \operatorname{rank}(A - 4I)^0 - \operatorname{rank}(A - 4I)^1 = 6 - 5 = 1.$$

Thus, a canonical basis for $A$ will have, corresponding to $\lambda_1 = 4,$ one generalized eigenvector each of ranks 4, 3, 2 and 1.

For $\lambda_2 = 5,$ we have $n - \mu_2 = 6 - 2 = 4,$

$(A - 5I)$ has rank 5,
$(A - 5I)^2$ has rank 4.

Therefore $m_2 = 2.$

$$\rho_2 = \operatorname{rank}(A - 5I)^1 - \operatorname{rank}(A - 5I)^2 = 5 - 4 = 1,$$
$$\rho_1 = \operatorname{rank}(A - 5I)^0 - \operatorname{rank}(A - 5I)^1 = 6 - 5 = 1.$$

Thus, a canonical basis for $A$ will have, corresponding to $\lambda_2 = 5,$ one generalized eigenvector each of ranks 2 and 1.

A canonical basis for $A$ is

$$\left\{ \mathbf x_1, \mathbf x_2, \mathbf x_3, \mathbf x_4, \mathbf y_1, \mathbf y_2 \right\} =
\left\{
\begin{pmatrix} -4 \\ 0 \\ 0 \\ 0 \\ 0 \\ 0 \end{pmatrix},
\begin{pmatrix} -27 \\ -4 \\ 0 \\ 0 \\ 0 \\ 0 \end{pmatrix},
\begin{pmatrix} 25 \\ -25 \\ -2 \\ 0 \\ 0 \\ 0 \end{pmatrix},
\begin{pmatrix} 0 \\ 36 \\ -12 \\ -2 \\ 2 \\ -1 \end{pmatrix},
\begin{pmatrix} 3 \\ 2 \\ 1 \\ 1 \\ 0 \\ 0 \end{pmatrix},
\begin{pmatrix} -8 \\ -4 \\ -1 \\ 0 \\ 1 \\ 0 \end{pmatrix}
\right\}.$$

$\mathbf x_1$ is the ordinary eigenvector associated with $\lambda_1$. $\mathbf x_2, \mathbf x_3$ and $\mathbf x_4$ are generalized eigenvectors associated with $\lambda_1$. $\mathbf y_1$ is the ordinary eigenvector associated with $\lambda_2$. $\mathbf y_2$ is a generalized eigenvector associated with $\lambda_2$.

A matrix $J$ in Jordan normal form, similar to $A$ is obtained as follows:

$$M =
\begin{pmatrix} \mathbf x_1 & \mathbf x_2 & \mathbf x_3 & \mathbf x_4 & \mathbf y_1 & \mathbf y_2 \end{pmatrix} =
\begin{pmatrix}
-4 & -27 &  25 &   0 & 3 & -8 \\
0 &  -4 & -25 &  36 & 2 & -4 \\
0 &   0 &  -2 & -12 & 1 & -1 \\
0 &   0 &   0 &  -2 & 1 &  0 \\
0 &   0 &   0 &   2 & 0 &  1 \\
0 &   0 &   0 &  -1 & 0 &  0
\end{pmatrix},$$
$$J = \begin{pmatrix}
4 & 1 & 0 & 0 & 0 & 0 \\
0 & 4 & 1 & 0 & 0 & 0 \\
0 & 0 & 4 & 1 & 0 & 0 \\
0 & 0 & 0 & 4 & 0 & 0 \\
0 & 0 & 0 & 0 & 5 & 1 \\
0 & 0 & 0 & 0 & 0 & 5
\end{pmatrix},$$

where the matrix $M$ is a generalized modal matrix for $A$ and $AM = MJ$.

== See also ==
- Canonical form
- Change of basis
- Normal basis
- Normal form (disambiguation)
- Polynomial basis
