= Weak localization =

Quantum physical phenomenon

There are many possible scattering paths in a disordered system

Weak localization is due primarily to self-intersecting scattering paths

Weak localization is a physical effect which occurs in disordered electronic systems at very low temperatures. The effect manifests itself as a positive correction to the resistivity of a metal or semiconductor. The name emphasizes the fact that weak localization is a precursor of Anderson localization, which occurs at strong disorder.

== General principle ==
The effect is quantum-mechanical in nature and has the following origin: In a disordered electronic system, the electron motion is diffusive rather than ballistic. That is, an electron does not move along a straight line, but experiences a series of random scatterings off impurities which results in a random walk.

The resistivity of the system is related to the probability of an electron to propagate between two given points in space. Classical physics assumes that the total probability is just the sum of the probabilities of the paths connecting the two points. However quantum mechanics tells us that to find the total probability we have to sum up the quantum-mechanical amplitudes of the paths rather than the probabilities themselves. Therefore, the correct (quantum-mechanical) formula for the probability for an electron to move from a point A to a point B includes the classical part (individual probabilities of diffusive paths) and a number of interference terms (products of the amplitudes corresponding to different paths). These interference terms effectively make it more likely that a carrier will "wander around in a circle" than it would otherwise, which leads to an increase in the net resistivity. The usual formula for the conductivity of a metal (the so-called Drude formula) corresponds to the former classical terms, while the weak localization correction corresponds to the latter quantum interference terms averaged over disorder realizations.

The weak localization correction can be shown to come mostly from quantum interference between self-crossing paths in which an electron can propagate in the clock-wise and counter-clockwise direction around a loop. Due to the identical length of the two paths along a loop, the quantum phases cancel each other exactly and these (otherwise random in sign) quantum interference terms survive disorder averaging. Since it is much more likely to find a self-crossing trajectory in low dimensions, the weak localization effect manifests itself much more strongly in low-dimensional systems (films and wires).

== Weak anti-localization ==
In a system with spin–orbit coupling, the spin of a carrier is coupled to its momentum. The spin of the carrier rotates as it goes around a self-intersecting path, and the direction of this rotation is opposite for the two directions about the loop. Because of this, the two paths along any loop interfere destructively which leads to a lower net resistivity.

== In two dimensions ==
In two dimensions the change in conductivity from applying a magnetic field, due to either weak localization or weak anti-localization can be described by the Hikami-Larkin-Nagaoka equation:
$$\sigma(B) = \sigma _0 - \frac{e^2}{2 \pi^2 \hbar} \left[
\psi\left(\frac{1}{2} + \frac{1}{\tau a}\right) -
\psi\left(\frac{1}{2} + \frac{1}{\tau_1 a}\right) +
\frac{1}{2} \psi\left(\frac{1}{2} + \frac{1}{\tau_2 a}\right) -
\frac{1}{2} \psi\left(\frac{1}{2} + \frac{1}{\tau_3 a}\right)
\right],$$
where $a = 4DeH/(\hbar c)$, $\tau, \tau_1, \tau_2, \tau_3$ are various relaxation times, and $\sigma_0$ is the conductivity of the system in the absence of weak localization or weak anti-localization. This theoretically derived equation was soon restated in terms of characteristic fields, which are more directly experimentally relevant quantities:
$$\sigma(B) = \sigma_0 - \frac{e^2}{2 \pi^2 \hbar} \left[
\psi\left(\frac{1}{2} + \frac{H_1}{H}\right) -
\psi\left(\frac{1}{2} + \frac{H_2}{H}\right) +
\frac{1}{2} \psi\left(\frac{1}{2} + \frac{H_3}{H}\right) -
\frac{1}{2} \psi\left(\frac{1}{2} + \frac{H_4}{H}\right)
\right],$$
where the characteristic fields are:
$$\begin{align}
H_1 &= H_0 + H_\text{SO} + H_\text{S}, \\
H_2 &= \frac{4}{3} H_\text{SO} + \frac{2}{3} H_\text{S} + H_\text{i}, \\
H_3 &= 2H_\text{S} + H_i, \\
H_4 &= \frac{2}{3} H_\text{S} + \frac{4}{3} H_\text{SO} + H_\text{i},
\end{align}$$
where $H_0$ is potential scattering, $H_\text{i}$ is inelastic scattering, $H_\text{S}$ is magnetic scattering, and $H_\text{SO}$ is spin–orbit scattering.

For a non-magnetic sample ($H_\text{S} = 0$), this can be rewritten as
$$\begin{align}
\sigma(B) - \sigma(0)
&= \frac{e^2}{2\pi^2 \hbar} \left[\ln\left(\frac{B_\phi}{B}\right) - \psi\left(\frac{1}{2} + \frac{B_\phi}{B}\right)\right] \\
&+ \frac{e^2}{\pi^2 \hbar} \left[\ln\left(\frac{B_\text{SO} + B_e}{B}\right) - \psi\left(\frac{1}{2} + \frac{B_\text{SO} + B_e}{B}\right)\right] \\
&- \frac{3e^2}{2 \pi^2 \hbar} \left[\ln\left(\frac{\frac{4}{3} B_\text{SO} + B_\phi}{B}\right) - \psi\left(\frac{1}{2} + \frac{\frac{4}{3} B_\text{SO} + B_\phi}{B}\right)\right],
\end{align}$$
where $\psi$ is the digamma function, $B_\phi$ is the phase-coherence characteristic field, which is roughly the magnetic field required to destroy phase coherence, $B_\text{SO}$ is the spin–orbit characteristic field, which can be considered a measure of the strength of the spin–orbit interaction, and $B_e$ is the elastic characteristic field.

The characteristic fields are better understood in terms of their corresponding characteristic lengths, which are deduced from $B_i = \hbar / (4el_i^2)$. Then $l_\phi$ can be understood as the distance traveled by an electron before it loses phase coherence, $l_\text{SO}$ can be thought of as the distance traveled before the spin of the electron undergoes the effect of the spin–orbit interaction, and $l_e$ is the mean free path.

In the limit of strong spin–orbit coupling $B_\text{SO} \gg B_\phi$, the equation above reduces to
$$\sigma(B) - \sigma(0) = \alpha \frac{e^2}{2\pi^2 \hbar} \left[\ln\left(\frac{B_\phi}{B}\right) - \psi\left(\frac{1}{2} + \frac{B_\phi}{B}\right)\right],$$
where $\alpha$ is −1 for weak antilocalization and +1/2 for weak localization.

== Magnetic field dependence ==
The strength of either weak localization or weak anti-localization falls off quickly in the presence of a magnetic field, which causes carriers to acquire an additional phase as they move around paths.

== See also ==
- Coherent backscattering
