= Defective matrix =

Non-diagonalizable matrix; one lacking a basis of eigenvectors

In linear algebra, a defective matrix is a square matrix that does not have a complete basis of eigenvectors, and is therefore not diagonalizable. In particular, an $n \times n$ matrix is defective if and only if it does not have $n$ linearly independent eigenvectors. A complete basis is formed by augmenting the eigenvectors with generalized eigenvectors, which are necessary for solving defective systems of ordinary differential equations and other problems.

An $n \times n$ defective matrix always has fewer than $n$ distinct eigenvalues, since distinct eigenvalues always have linearly independent eigenvectors. In particular, a defective matrix has one or more eigenvalues $\lambda$ with algebraic multiplicity $m > 1$ (that is, they are multiple roots of the characteristic polynomial), but fewer than $m$ linearly independent eigenvectors associated with $\lambda$. If the algebraic multiplicity of $\lambda$ exceeds its geometric multiplicity (that is, the number of linearly independent eigenvectors associated with $\lambda$), then $\lambda$ is said to be a defective eigenvalue. However, every eigenvalue with algebraic multiplicity $m$ always has $m$ linearly independent generalized eigenvectors.

A real symmetric matrix and more generally a Hermitian matrix, and a unitary matrix, is never defective; more generally, a normal matrix (which includes Hermitian and unitary matrices as special cases) is never defective.

== Jordan block ==
Any nontrivial Jordan block of size $2 \times 2$ or larger (that is, not completely diagonal) is defective. (A diagonal matrix is a special case of the Jordan normal form with all trivial Jordan blocks of size $1 \times 1$ and is not defective.) For example, the $n \times n$ Jordan block

$$J = \begin{bmatrix}
\lambda & 1            & \;     & \;  \\
\;        & \lambda    & \ddots & \;  \\
\;        & \;           & \ddots & 1   \\
\;        & \;           & \;     & \lambda
\end{bmatrix},$$

has an eigenvalue, $\lambda$ with algebraic multiplicity $n$ (or greater if there are other Jordan blocks with the same eigenvalue), but only one distinct eigenvector $J v_1 = \lambda v_1$, where
$$v_1 = \begin{bmatrix} 1 \\ 0 \\ \vdots \\ 0 \end{bmatrix}.$$
The other canonical basis vectors
$$v_2 = \begin{bmatrix} 0 \\ 1 \\ \vdots \\ 0 \end{bmatrix}, ~ \ldots, ~ v_n = \begin{bmatrix} 0 \\ 0 \\ \vdots \\ 1 \end{bmatrix}$$
form a chain of generalized eigenvectors such that $J v_k = \lambda v_k + v_{k-1}$ for $k=2,\ldots,n$.

Any defective matrix has a nontrivial Jordan normal form, which is as close as one can come to diagonalization of such a matrix.

== Example ==
A simple example of a defective matrix is

$$\begin{bmatrix} 3 & 1 \\ 0 & 3 \end{bmatrix},$$

which has a double eigenvalue of 3 but only one distinct eigenvector

$$\begin{bmatrix} 1 \\ 0 \end{bmatrix}$$

(and constant multiples thereof).

== See also ==
- Jordan normal form – Form of a matrix indicating its eigenvalues and their algebraic multiplicities
