= Back scattering alignment =

The Back Scattering Alignment (BSA) is a coordinate system used in coherent electromagnetic scattering. The coordinate system is defined from the viewpoint of the wave source, before and after scattering. The BSA is most commonly used in radar, specifically when working with a Sinclair Matrix because the monostatic radar detector and source are physically coaligned. BSA gives rise to conjugate eigenvalue equations. The alternative coordinate system in electromagnetic scattering is the Forward Scattering Alignment (FSA) which is primarily used in optics. Both coordinate systems contain essentially the same information and meaning, and thus a scattering matrix can be transformed from one to the other by use of the matrix,

$$S_{FSA} = \begin{bmatrix} 1 & 0 \\ 0 & -1 \end{bmatrix} S_{BSA}$$

== See also ==
- Backscatter
- Electromagnetic radiation
