= Forward scattering alignment =

The Forward Scattering Alignment (FSA) is a coordinate system used in coherent electromagnetic scattering indicating direction.

The coordinate system is defined from the viewpoint of the electromagnetic wave, before and after scattering. The FSA is most commonly used in optics, specifically when working with Jones calculus because the electromagnetic wave is typically followed through a series of optical components that represent separate scattering events. It is also considered in the content of remote sensing and radar.

FSA gives rise to regular eigenvalue equations. The general alternative coordinate system in electromagnetic scattering is the Back Scattering Alignment (BSA) which is primarily used in radar. Both coordinate systems contain essentially the same information and meaning, and thus a scattering matrix can be transformed from one to the other by use of the matrix,

$$S_{FSA} = \begin{bmatrix} 1 & 0 \\ 0 & -1 \end{bmatrix} S_{BSA}$$

== See also ==
- Forward scatter
