= Canonical form =

Standard representation of a mathematical object

Algorithmic anagram test using multisets as canonical forms: The strings "madam curie" and "radium came" are given as C arrays. Each one is converted into a canonical form by sorting. Since both sorted strings literally agree, the original strings were anagrams of each other.

In mathematics and computer science, a canonical, normal, or standard form of a mathematical object is a standard way of presenting that object as a mathematical expression. Often, it is one which provides the simplest representation of an object and allows it to be identified in a unique way. The distinction between "canonical" and "normal" forms varies from subfield to subfield. In most fields, a canonical form specifies a unique representation for every object, while a normal form simply specifies its form, without the requirement of uniqueness.

The canonical form of a positive integer in decimal representation is a finite sequence of digits that does not begin with zero. More generally, for a class of objects on which an equivalence relation is defined, a canonical form consists in the choice of a specific object in each class. For example:

- Jordan normal form is a canonical form for matrix similarity.
- The row echelon form is a canonical form, when one considers as equivalent a matrix and its left product by an invertible matrix.

In computer science, and more specifically in computer algebra, when representing mathematical objects in a computer, there are usually many different ways to represent the same object. In this context, a canonical form is a representation such that every object has a unique representation (with canonicalization being the process through which a representation is put into its canonical form). Thus, the equality of two objects can easily be tested by testing the equality of their canonical forms.

Despite this advantage, canonical forms frequently depend on arbitrary choices (like ordering the variables), which introduce difficulties for testing the equality of two objects resulting in independent computations. Therefore, in computer algebra, normal form is a weaker notion: A normal form is a representation such that zero is uniquely represented. This allows testing for equality by putting the difference of two objects in normal form.

Canonical form can also mean a differential form that is defined in a natural (canonical) way.

== Definition ==
Given a set S of objects with an equivalence relation R on S, a canonical form is given by designating some objects of S to be "in canonical form", such that every object under consideration is equivalent to exactly one object in canonical form. In other words, the canonical forms in S represent the equivalence classes, once and only once. To test whether two objects are equivalent, it then suffices to test equality on their canonical forms. A canonical form thus provides a classification theorem and more, in that it not only classifies every class, but also gives a distinguished (canonical) representative for each object in the class.

Formally, a canonicalization with respect to an equivalence relation R on a set S is a mapping c:S→S such that for all s, s_{1}, s_{2} ∈ S:

1. c(s) = c(c(s)) (idempotence),
2. s_{1} R s_{2} if and only if c(s_{1}) = c(s_{2}) (decisiveness), and
3. s R c(s) (representativeness).

Property 3 is redundant; it follows by applying 2 to 1.

In practical terms, it is often advantageous to be able to recognize the canonical forms. There is also a practical, algorithmic question to consider: how to pass from a given object s in S to its canonical form s*? Canonical forms are generally used to make operating with equivalence classes more effective. For example, in modular arithmetic, the canonical form for a residue class is usually taken as the least non-negative integer in it. Operations on classes are carried out by combining these representatives, and then reducing the result to its least non-negative residue. The uniqueness requirement is sometimes relaxed, allowing the forms to be unique up to some finer equivalence relation, such as allowing for reordering of terms (if there is no natural ordering on terms).

A canonical form may simply be a convention, or a deep theorem. For example, polynomials are conventionally written with the terms in descending powers: it is more usual to write x^{2} + x + 30 than x + 30 + x^{2}, although the two forms define the same polynomial. By contrast, the existence of Jordan canonical form for a matrix is a deep theorem.

== History ==
According to OED and LSJ, the term canonical stems from the Ancient Greek word kanonikós (κανονικός, "regular, according to rule") from kanṓn (κᾰνών, "rod, rule"). The sense of norm, standard, or archetype has been used in many disciplines. Mathematical usage is attested in a 1738 letter from Logan. The German term kanonische Form is attested in a 1846 paper by Eisenstein, later the same year Richelot uses the term Normalform in a paper, and in 1851 Sylvester writes:

"I now proceed to [...] the mode of reducing Algebraical Functions to their simplest and most symmetrical, or as my admirable friend M. Hermite well proposes to call them, their Canonical forms."

In the same period, usage is attested by Hesse ("Normalform"), Hermite ("forme canonique"), Borchardt ("forme canonique"), and Cayley ("canonical form").

In 1865, the Dictionary of Science, Literature and Art defines canonical form as:

"In Mathematics, denotes a form, usually the simplest or most symmetrical, to which, without loss of generality, all functions of the same class can be reduced."

== Examples ==
Note: in this section, "up to" some equivalence relation E means that the canonical form is not unique in general, but that if one object has two different canonical forms, they are E-equivalent.

=== Large number notation ===
Standard form is used by many mathematicians and scientists to write extremely large numbers in a more concise and understandable way, the most prominent of which being the scientific notation.

=== Number theory ===
- Canonical representation of a positive integer
- The canonical form of a continued fraction for representing a number is the simple continued fraction

=== Linear algebra ===
Objects	A is equivalent to B if:	Normal form	Notes
Normal matrices over the complex numbers	$A=U^*B U$ for some unitary matrix U	Diagonal matrices (up to reordering)	This is the Spectral theorem
Matrices over the complex numbers	$A=U B V^*$ for some unitary matrices U and V	Diagonal matrices with real non-negative entries (in descending order)	Singular value decomposition
Matrices over an algebraically closed field	$A=P^{-1} B P$ for some invertible matrix P	Jordan normal form (up to reordering of blocks)	
Matrices over an algebraically closed field	$A=P^{-1} B P$ for some invertible matrix P	Weyr canonical form (up to reordering of blocks)	
Matrices over a field	$A=P^{-1} B P$ for some invertible matrix P	Frobenius normal form	
Matrices over a principal ideal domain	$A=P^{-1} B Q$ for some invertible matrices P and Q	Smith normal form (up to unit factors)	The equivalence is the same as allowing invertible elementary row and column transformations
Matrices over the integers	$A=UB$ for some unimodular matrix U	Hermite normal form	
Matrices over the integers modulo n		Howell normal form	
Finite-dimensional vector spaces over a field K	A and B are isomorphic as vector spaces	$K^n$, n a non-negative integer	

=== Algebra ===
Objects	A is equivalent to B if:	Normal form
Finitely generated R-modules with R a principal ideal domain	A and B are isomorphic as R-modules	Primary decomposition (up to reordering) or invariant factor decomposition

=== Geometry ===
In analytic geometry:

- The equation of a line: Ax + By = C, with A^{2} + B^{2} = 1 and C ≥ 0
- The equation of a circle: $(x - h)^2 + (y - k)^2 = r^2$

By contrast, there are alternative forms for writing equations. For example, the equation of a line may be written as a linear equation in point-slope and slope-intercept form.

Convex polyhedra can be put into canonical form such that:

- All faces are flat,
- All edges are tangent to the unit sphere, and
- The centroid of the polyhedron is at the origin.

=== Integrable systems ===
Every differentiable manifold has a cotangent bundle. That bundle can always be endowed with a certain differential form, called the canonical one-form. This form gives the cotangent bundle the structure of a symplectic manifold, and allows vector fields on the manifold to be integrated by means of the Euler–Lagrange equations, or by means of Hamiltonian mechanics. Such systems of integrable differential equations are called integrable systems.

=== Dynamical systems ===
The study of dynamical systems overlaps with that of integrable systems; there one has the idea of a normal form (dynamical systems).

=== Three dimensional geometry ===
In the study of manifolds in three dimensions, one has the first fundamental form, the second fundamental form and the third fundamental form.

=== Functional analysis ===
Objects	A is equivalent to B if:	Normal form
Hilbert spaces	If A and B are both Hilbert spaces of infinite dimension, then A and B are isometrically isomorphic.	$\ell^2(I)$ sequence spaces (up to exchanging the index set I with another index set of the same cardinality)
Commutative C*-algebras with unit	A and B are isomorphic as C*-algebras	The algebra $C(X)$ of continuous functions on a compact Hausdorff space, up to homeomorphism of the base space.

=== Classical logic ===
- Negation normal form
- Conjunctive normal form
- Disjunctive normal form
- Algebraic normal form
- Prenex normal form
- Skolem normal form
- Blake canonical form, also known as the complete sum of prime implicants, the complete sum, or the disjunctive prime form

=== Set theory ===
- Cantor normal form of an ordinal number

=== Game theory ===
- Normal form game

=== Proof theory ===
- Normal form (natural deduction)

=== Rewriting systems ===
The symbolic manipulation of a formula from one form to another is called a "rewriting" of that formula. One can study the abstract properties of rewriting generic formulas, by studying the collection of rules by which formulas can be validly manipulated. These are the "rewriting rules"—an integral part of an abstract rewriting system. A common question is whether it is possible to bring some generic expression to a single, common form, the normal form. If different sequences of rewrites still result in the same form, then that form can be termed a normal form, with the rewrite being called a confluent. It is not always possible to obtain a normal form.

=== Lambda calculus ===
- A lambda term is in beta normal form if no beta reduction is possible; lambda calculus is a particular case of an abstract rewriting system. In the untyped lambda calculus, for example, the term $(\lambda x.(x x) \; \lambda x.(x x))$ does not have a normal form. In the typed lambda calculus, every well-formed term can be rewritten to its normal form.

=== Graph theory ===
In graph theory, a branch of mathematics, graph canonization is the problem of finding a canonical form of a given graph G. A canonical form is a labeled graph Canon(G) that is isomorphic to G, such that every graph that is isomorphic to G has the same canonical form as G. Thus, from a solution to the graph canonization problem, one could also solve the problem of graph isomorphism: to test whether two graphs G and H are isomorphic, compute their canonical forms Canon(G) and Canon(H), and test whether these two canonical forms are identical.

=== Computing ===
In computing, the reduction of data to any kind of canonical form is commonly called data normalization.

For instance, database normalization is the process of organizing the fields and tables of a relational database to minimize redundancy and dependency.

In the field of software security, a common vulnerability is unchecked malicious input (see Code injection). The mitigation for this problem is proper input validation. Before input validation is performed, the input is usually normalized by eliminating encoding (e.g., HTML encoding) and reducing the input data to a single common character set.

Other forms of data, typically associated with signal processing (including audio and imaging) or machine learning, can be normalized in order to provide a limited range of values.

In content management, the concept of a single source of truth (SSOT) is applicable, just as it is in database normalization generally and in software development. Competent content management systems provide logical ways of obtaining it, such as transclusion.

== See also ==
- Canonicalization
- Canonical basis
- Canonical class
- Normalization (disambiguation)
- Standardization
