= Classification theorem =

Describes the objects of a given type, up to some equivalence

In mathematics, a classification theorem answers the classification problem: "What are the objects of a given type, up to some equivalence?". It gives a non-redundant enumeration: each object is equivalent to exactly one class.

A few issues related to classification are the following.

- The equivalence problem is "given two objects, determine if they are equivalent".
- A complete set of invariants, together with which invariants are realizable, solves the classification problem, and is often a step in solving it. (A combination of invariant values is realizable if there in fact exists an object whose invariants take on the specified set of values)
- A computable complete set of invariants (together with which invariants are realizable) solves both the classification problem and the equivalence problem.
- A canonical form solves the classification problem, and is more data: it not only classifies every class, but provides a distinguished (canonical) element of each class.

There exist many classification theorems in mathematics, as described below.

== Geometry ==
- Classification of Euclidean plane isometries – Isometry of the Eluclidean plane
- Classification of Platonic solids
- Classification theorems of surfaces
  - Classification of two-dimensional closed manifolds – Two-dimensional manifold
  - Enriques–Kodaira classification – Mathematical classification of surfaces of algebraic surfaces (complex dimension two, real dimension four)
  - Nielsen–Thurston classification – Characterizes homeomorphisms of a compact orientable surface which characterizes homeomorphisms of a compact surface
- Thurston's eight model geometries, and the geometrization conjecture – Three dimensional analogue of uniformization conjecture
- Berger classification – Concept in differential geometry
- Classification of Riemannian symmetric spaces – (pseudo-)Riemannian manifold whose geodesics are reversible
- Classification of 3-dimensional lens spaces – Class of topological space
- Classification of manifolds – Basic question in geometry and topology

== Algebra ==
- Classification of finite simple groups – Theorem classifying finite simple groups
  - Classification of Abelian groups – Commutative group (mathematics)
  - Classification of Finitely generated abelian group – Commutative group where every element is the sum of elements from one finite subset
  - Classification of Rank 3 permutation group – Five sporadic simple groups
  - Classification of 2-transitive permutation groups
- Artin–Wedderburn theorem – Classification of semi-simple rings and algebras — a classification theorem for semisimple rings
- Classification of Clifford algebras – Classification in abstract algebra
- Classification of low-dimensional real Lie algebras
- Classification of Simple Lie algebras and groups
  - Classification of simple complex Lie algebras – Direct sum of simple Lie algebras
  - Classification of simple real Lie algebras – Term in mathematics
  - Classification of centerless simple Lie groups – Connected non-abelian Lie group lacking nontrivial connected normal subgroups
  - Classification of simple Lie groups – Connected non-abelian Lie group lacking nontrivial connected normal subgroups
- Bianchi classification – Lie algebra classification
- ADE classification – Mathematical classification
- Langlands classification – Mathematical theory

== Linear algebra ==
- Finite-dimensional vector space – Number of vectors in any basis of the vector spaces (by dimension)
- Rank–nullity theorem – In linear algebra, relation between 3 dimensions (by rank and nullity)
- Structure theorem for finitely generated modules over a principal ideal domain – Statement in abstract algebra
- Jordan normal form – Form of a matrix indicating its eigenvalues and their algebraic multiplicities
- Frobenius normal form – Canonical form of matrices over a field (rational canonical form)
- Sylvester's law of inertia – Theorem of matrix algebra of invariance properties under basis transformations

== Analysis ==
- Classification of discontinuities – Mathematical analysis of discontinuous points

== Dynamical systems ==
- Classification of Fatou components – Components of the Fatou set
- Ratner classification theorem

== Mathematical physics ==
- Classification of electromagnetic fields
- Petrov classification – Classification used in differential geometry and general relativity
- Segre classification – Algebraic classification of rank two symmetric tensors
- Wigner's classification – Classification of irreducible representations of the Poincaré group

== See also ==
- Representation theorem – Proof that every structure with certain properties is isomorphic to another structure
- Comparison theorem
- Moduli space – Geometric space whose points represent algebro-geometric objects of some fixed kind
- List of manifolds
- List of theorems
