= Complete set of invariants =

In mathematics, a complete set of invariants for a classification problem is a collection of maps

$$f_i : X \to Y_i$$

(where $X$ is the collection of objects being classified, up to some equivalence relation $\sim$, and the $Y_i$ are some sets), such that $x \sim x'$ if and only if $f_i(x) = f_i(x')$ for all $i$. In words, such that two objects are equivalent if and only if all invariants are equal.

Symbolically, a complete set of invariants is a collection of maps such that

$$\left( \prod f_i \right) : (X/\sim) \to \left( \prod Y_i \right)$$

is injective.

As invariants are, by definition, equal on equivalent objects, equality of invariants is a necessary condition for equivalence; a complete set of invariants is a set such that equality of these is also sufficient for equivalence. In the context of a group action, this may be stated as: invariants are functions of coinvariants (equivalence classes, orbits), and a complete set of invariants characterizes the coinvariants (is a set of defining equations for the coinvariants).

== Examples ==
- In the classification of two-dimensional closed manifolds, Euler characteristic (or genus) and orientability are a complete set of invariants.
- The Jordan normal form of a matrix is a complete invariant for matrices over a field up to conjugation (similarity), but eigenvalues (with multiplicities) are not.
- The elementary divisors are a complete invariant for matrices over a principal ideal domain up to conjugation (or for finitely generated modules over a PID up to isomorphism).
- The signature and rank of a matrix are a complete set of invariants for real symmetric matrices up to congruence (or for real quadratic forms up to equivalence), by Sylvester's law of inertia.

== Realizability of invariants ==
A complete set of invariants does not immediately yield a classification theorem: not all combinations of invariants may be realized. Symbolically, one must also determine the image of

$$\prod f_i : X \to \prod Y_i.$$
