= Hermite ring =

In algebra, the term Hermite ring (after Charles Hermite) has been applied to three different objects.

According to Kaplansky (1949), a ring is right Hermite if, for every two elements a and b of the ring, there is an element d of the ring and an invertible 2×2 matrix M over the ring such that (a b)M = (d 0), and the term left Hermite is defined similarly. Matrices over such a ring can be put in Hermite normal form by right multiplication by a square invertible matrix. Lam (2006) calls this property K-Hermite, using Hermite instead in the sense given below.

According to Lam (1978), a ring is right Hermite if any finitely generated stably free right module over the ring is free. This is equivalent to requiring that any row vector (b_{1},...,b_{n}) of elements of the ring which generate it as a right module (i.e., b_{1}R + ... + b_{n}R = R) can be completed to a (not necessarily square) invertible matrix by adding some number of rows. The criterion of being left Hermite can be defined similarly. Lissner (1965) earlier called a commutative ring with this property an H-ring.

According to Cohn (2006), a ring is Hermite if, in addition to every stably free (left) module being free, it has invariant basis number.

All commutative rings which are Hermite in the sense of Kaplansky are also Hermite in the sense of Lam, but the converse is not necessarily true. All Bézout domains are Hermite in the sense of Kaplansky, and a commutative ring which is Hermite in the sense of Kaplansky is also a Bézout ring.

The Hermite ring conjecture, introduced by Lam (1978), states that if R is a commutative Hermite ring, then the polynomial ring R[x] is also a Hermite ring.
