= Stably free module =

In mathematics, a stably free module is a module which is close to being free.

== Definition ==
A module M over a ring R is stably free if there exists a free finitely generated module F over R such that $M \oplus F$ is a free module.

== Properties ==
- A projective module is stably free if and only if it possesses a finite free resolution.
- An infinitely generated module is stably free if and only if it is free.

== See also ==
- Free object
- Eilenberg–Mazur swindle
- Hermite ring
