= Wilhelm Specht =

German mathematician

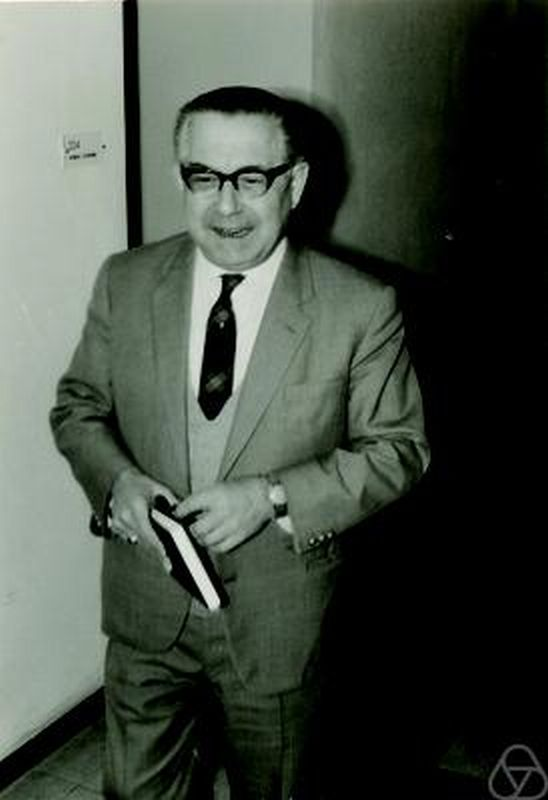
Wilhelm Specht

Wilhelm Otto Ludwig Specht (22 September 1907, Rastatt – 19 February 1985) was a German mathematician who introduced Specht modules. He also proved the Specht criterion for unitary equivalence of matrices.

== Works ==
- Gruppentheorie. Grundlehren der mathematischen Wissenschaften. Springer, 1956.
- Elementare Beweise der Primzahlsätze. Deutscher Verlag der Wissenschaften, Berlin 1956.
- Algebraische Gleichungen mit reellen oder komplexen Koeffizienten. Enzyklopädie der mathematischen Wissenschaften. 1958.
