= Normal form (natural deduction) =

In mathematical logic and proof theory, a derivation in normal form in the context of natural deduction refers to a proof which contains no detours – steps in which a formula is first introduced and then immediately eliminated.

The concept of normalization in natural deduction was introduced by Dag Prawitz in the 1960s as part of a general effort to analyze the structure of proofs and eliminate unnecessary reasoning steps. The associated normalization theorem establishes that every derivation in natural deduction can be transformed into normal form.

== Definition ==
Natural deduction is a system of formal logic that uses introduction and elimination rules for each logical connective. Introduction rules describe how to construct a formula of a particular form, while elimination rules describe how to infer information from such formulas. A derivation is in normal form if it contains no formula which is both:

- the conclusion of an introduction rule, and
- the major premise of an elimination rule.

A derivation containing such a structure is said to include a detour. Normalization involves transforming a derivation to remove all such detours, thereby producing a proof that directly reflects the logical dependencies of the conclusion on the assumptions.

Another definition of normal derivation in classical logic with general elimination rules is:

A derivation in NK is normal if all major premisses of E-rules are assumptions.

== Normalization theorem ==
The normalization theorem for natural deduction states that:

Every derivation in natural deduction can be converted into a derivation in normal form.

This result was first proved by Dag Prawitz in 1965. The normalization process typically involves identifying and eliminating maximal formulas – formulas introduced and immediately eliminated—through a sequence of local reduction steps.

Normalization has several important consequences:

- It implies the subformula property: any formula occurring in the proof is a subformula of the assumptions or conclusion.
- It guarantees consistency of the system: there is no derivation of a contradiction from no assumptions.
- It supports constructive content in logic: proofs correspond to explicit constructions or computations.

== Examples ==
=== Implication ===
A derivation of $A \rightarrow A$ that includes a detour:

1. [A]    (assumption)
2. A → A  (→ introduction, discharging 1)
3. [A]    (assumption)
4. A      (→ elimination on 2 and 3)

This introduces and then immediately eliminates an implication. A normal derivation is:

1. [A]
2. A → A  (→ introduction)

=== Conjunction ===
A derivation of $A, B \vdash A$ that includes a detour:

$$\frac{
\frac{
A \quad B
}{
A \land B
}[\land\text{I}]
}{
A
}[\land\text{E}]
\quad \Rightarrow \quad A$$

The elimination is unnecessary if $A$ is already available.

== Applications ==
Normalization is central to several areas of logic and computer science:

- In proof theory, it ensures that logical systems have desirable meta-properties such as consistency and the subformula property.
- In type theory, it underlies the soundness and completeness of type-checking algorithms.
- In proof assistants (e.g. Rocq, Agda), normalization is used to verify that formal proofs are constructive and terminating.
- In functional programming, the normalization process corresponds to evaluation strategies for typed lambda calculi.

== See also ==
- Natural deduction
- Curry–Howard correspondence
- Cut-elimination theorem
- Sequent calculus
