= Invariant factor =

Concept in abstract algebra

The invariant factors of a module over a principal ideal domain (PID) occur in one form of the structure theorem for finitely generated modules over a principal ideal domain.

If $R$ is a PID and $M$ a finitely generated $R$-module, then

$$M\cong R^r\oplus R/(a_1)\oplus R/(a_2)\oplus\cdots\oplus R/(a_m)$$

for some integer $r\geq0$ and a (possibly empty) list of nonzero elements $a_1,\ldots,a_m\in R$ for which $a_1 \mid a_2 \mid \cdots \mid a_m$. The nonnegative integer $r$ is called the free rank or Betti number of the module $M$, while $a_1,\ldots,a_m$ are the invariant factors of $M$ and are unique up to associatedness.

The invariant factors of a matrix over a PID occur in the Smith normal form and provide a means of computing the structure of a module from a set of generators and relations.

== See also ==
- Elementary divisors
