= Cyclic module =

In mathematics, more specifically in ring theory, a cyclic module or monogenous module is a module over a ring that is generated by one element. The concept is a generalization of the notion of a cyclic group, that is, an Abelian group (i.e. Z-module) that is generated by one element.

== Definition ==
A left R-module M is called cyclic if M can be generated by a single element i.e. M = (x) = Rx = {rx | r ∈ R} for some x in M. Similarly, a right R-module N is cyclic if N = yR for some y ∈ N.

== Examples ==
- 2Z as a Z-module is a cyclic module.
- In fact, every cyclic group is a cyclic Z-module.
- Every simple R-module M is a cyclic module since the submodule generated by any non-zero element x of M is necessarily the whole module M. In general, a module is simple if and only if it is nonzero and is generated by each of its nonzero elements.
- If the ring R is considered as a left module over itself, then its cyclic submodules are exactly its left principal ideals as a ring. The same holds for R as a right R-module, mutatis mutandis.
- If R is F[x], the ring of polynomials over a field F, and V is an R-module which is also a finite-dimensional vector space over F, then the Jordan blocks of x acting on V are cyclic submodules. (The Jordan blocks are all isomorphic to F[x] / (x − λ)^{n}; there may also be other cyclic submodules with different annihilators; see below.)

== Properties ==
- Given a cyclic R-module M that is generated by x, there exists a canonical isomorphism between M and R / Ann_{R} x, where Ann_{R} x denotes the annihilator of x in R.

== See also ==
- Finitely generated module
