= Jordan matrix =

Block diagonal matrix of Jordan blocks

In the mathematical discipline of matrix theory, a Jordan matrix, named after Camille Jordan, is a block diagonal matrix over a ring R (whose identities are the zero (0) and one (1)), where each block along the diagonal, called a Jordan block, has the following form:
$$\begin{bmatrix}
\lambda & 1       & 0      & \cdots  & 0      \\
0       & \lambda & 1      & \cdots  & 0      \\
\vdots  & \vdots  & \ddots & \ddots  & \vdots \\
0       & 0       & 0      & \lambda & 1      \\
0       & 0       & 0      & 0       & \lambda
\end{bmatrix}.$$

== Definition ==
Every Jordan block is specified by its dimension n and its eigenvalue $\lambda\in R$, and is denoted as J_{λ,n}. It is an $n\times n$ matrix of zeroes everywhere except for the diagonal, which is filled with $\lambda$ and for the superdiagonal, which is composed of ones.

Any block diagonal matrix whose blocks are Jordan blocks is called a Jordan matrix. This (n_{1} + ⋯ + n_{r}) × (n_{1} + ⋯ + n_{r}) square matrix, consisting of r diagonal blocks, can be compactly indicated as $J_{\lambda_1,n_1}\oplus \cdots \oplus J_{\lambda_r,n_r}$ or $\mathrm{diag}\left(J_{\lambda_1,n_1}, \ldots, J_{\lambda_r,n_r}\right)$, where the i-th Jordan block is J_{λ_{i},n_{i}}.

For example, the matrix
$$J=\left[\begin{array}{ccc|cc|cc|ccc}
0 & 1 & 0 & 0 & 0 & 0 & 0 & 0 & 0 & 0 \\
0 & 0 & 1 & 0 & 0 & 0 & 0 & 0 & 0 & 0 \\
0 & 0 & 0 & 0 & 0 & 0 & 0 & 0 & 0 & 0 \\ \hline
0 & 0 & 0 & i & 1 & 0 & 0 & 0 & 0 & 0 \\
0 & 0 & 0 & 0 & i & 0 & 0 & 0 & 0 & 0 \\ \hline
0 & 0 & 0 & 0 & 0 & i & 1 & 0 & 0 & 0 \\
0 & 0 & 0 & 0 & 0 & 0 & i & 0 & 0 & 0 \\ \hline
0 & 0 & 0 & 0 & 0 & 0 & 0 & 7 & 1 & 0 \\
0 & 0 & 0 & 0 & 0 & 0 & 0 & 0 & 7 & 1 \\
0 & 0 & 0 & 0 & 0 & 0 & 0 & 0 & 0 & 7 \end{array}\right]$$
is a 10 × 10 Jordan matrix with a 3 × 3 block with eigenvalue 0, two 2 × 2 blocks with eigenvalue the imaginary unit i, and a 3 × 3 block with eigenvalue 7. Its Jordan-block structure is written as either $J_{0,3}\oplus J_{i,2}\oplus J_{i,2}\oplus J_{7,3}$ or diag(J_{0,3}, J_{i,2}, J_{i,2}, J_{7,3}).

== Linear algebra ==
Any n × n square matrix A whose elements are in an algebraically closed field K is similar to a Jordan matrix J, also in $\mathbb{M}_n (K)$, which is unique up to a permutation of its diagonal blocks themselves. J is called the Jordan normal form of A and corresponds to a generalization of the diagonalization procedure. A diagonalizable matrix is similar, in fact, to a special case of Jordan matrix: the matrix whose blocks are all 1 × 1.

More generally, given a Jordan matrix $J=J_{\lambda_1,m_1}\oplus J_{\lambda_2,m_2} \oplus\cdots\oplus J_{\lambda_N,m_N}$, that is, whose kth diagonal block, $1 \leq k \leq N$, is the Jordan block J_{λ_{k},m_{k}} and whose diagonal elements $\lambda_k$ may not all be distinct, the geometric multiplicity of $\lambda\in K$ for the matrix J, indicated as $\operatorname{gmul}_J \lambda$, corresponds to the number of Jordan blocks whose eigenvalue is λ. Whereas the index of an eigenvalue $\lambda$ for J, indicated as $\operatorname{idx}_J \lambda$, is defined as the dimension of the largest Jordan block associated to that eigenvalue.

The same goes for all the matrices A similar to J, so $\operatorname{idx}_A \lambda$ can be defined accordingly with respect to the Jordan normal form of A for any of its eigenvalues $\lambda \in \operatorname{spec}A$. In this case one can check that the index of $\lambda$ for A is equal to its multiplicity as a root of the minimal polynomial of A (whereas, by definition, its algebraic multiplicity for A, $\operatorname{mul}_A \lambda$, is its multiplicity as a root of the characteristic polynomial of A; that is, $\det(A-xI)\in K[x]$). An equivalent necessary and sufficient condition for A to be diagonalizable in K is that all of its eigenvalues have index equal to 1; that is, its minimal polynomial has only simple roots.

Note that knowing a matrix's spectrum with all of its algebraic/geometric multiplicities and indexes does not always allow for the computation of its Jordan normal form (this may be a sufficient condition only for spectrally simple, usually low-dimensional matrices). Indeed, determining the Jordan normal form is generally a computationally challenging task. From the vector space point of view, the Jordan normal form is equivalent to finding an orthogonal decomposition (that is, via direct sums of eigenspaces represented by Jordan blocks) of the domain which the associated generalized eigenvectors make a basis for.

== Functions of matrices ==
Let $A\in\mathbb{M}_n (\Complex)$ (that is, a n × n complex matrix) and $C\in\mathrm{GL}_n (\Complex)$ be the change of basis matrix to the Jordan normal form of A; that is, A = C^{−1}JC. Now let f (z) be a holomorphic function on an open set $\Omega$ such that $\mathrm{spec}A \subset \Omega \subseteq \Complex$; that is, the spectrum of the matrix is contained inside the domain of holomorphy of f. Let
$$f(z)=\sum_{h=0}^{\infty}a_h (z-z_0)^h$$
be the power series expansion of f around $z_0\in\Omega \setminus \operatorname{spec}A$, which will be hereinafter supposed to be 0 for simplicity's sake. The matrix f (A) is then defined via the following formal power series
$$f(A)=\sum_{h=0}^{\infty}a_h A^h$$
and is absolutely convergent with respect to the Euclidean norm of $\mathbb{M}_n (\Complex)$. To put it another way, f (A) converges absolutely for every square matrix whose spectral radius is less than the radius of convergence of f around 0 and is uniformly convergent on any compact subsets of $\mathbb{M}_n (\Complex)$ satisfying this property in the matrix Lie group topology.

The Jordan normal form allows the computation of functions of matrices without explicitly computing an infinite series, which is one of the main achievements of Jordan matrices. Using the facts that the kth power ($k\in\N_0$) of a diagonal block matrix is the diagonal block matrix whose blocks are the kth powers of the respective blocks; that is, $\left(A_1 \oplus A_2 \oplus A_3 \oplus\cdots\right)^k=A^k_1 \oplus A_2^k \oplus A_3^k \oplus\cdots$, and that A^{k} = C^{−1}J^{k}C, the above matrix power series becomes

$$f(A) = C^{-1}f(J)C = C^{-1}\left(\bigoplus_{k=1}^N f\left(J_{\lambda_k ,m_k}\right)\right)C$$

where the last series need not be computed explicitly via power series of every Jordan block. In fact, if $\lambda\in\Omega$, any holomorphic function of a Jordan block $f(J_{\lambda,n}) = f(\lambda I+Z)$ has a finite power series around $\lambda I$ because $Z^n=0$. Here, $Z$ is the nilpotent part of $J$ and $Z^k$ has all 0's except 1's along the $k^{\text{th}}$ superdiagonal. Thus it is the following upper triangular matrix:
$$f(J_{\lambda,n})= \sum_{k=0}^{n-1} \frac{f^{(k)}(\lambda) Z^k}{k!} =
\begin{bmatrix}
f(\lambda) & f^\prime (\lambda) & \frac{f^{\prime\prime}(\lambda)}{2} & \cdots & \frac{f^{(n-2)}(\lambda)}{(n-2)!} & \frac{f^{(n-1)}(\lambda)}{(n-1)!} \\
0      & f(\lambda) & f^\prime (\lambda) & \cdots & \frac{f^{(n-3)}(\lambda)}{(n-3)!} & \frac{f^{(n-2)}(\lambda)}{(n-2)!} \\
0      & 0      & f(\lambda) & \cdots & \frac{f^{(n-4)}(\lambda)}{(n-4)!} & \frac{f^{(n-3)}(\lambda)}{(n-3)!} \\
\vdots & \vdots & \vdots & \ddots & \vdots     & \vdots \\
0      & 0      & 0      & \cdots & f(\lambda) & f^\prime (\lambda) \\
0      & 0      & 0      & \cdots & 0          & f(\lambda) \\
\end{bmatrix}.$$

As a consequence of this, the computation of any function of a matrix is straightforward whenever its Jordan normal form and its change-of-basis matrix are known. For example, using $f(z)=1/z$, the inverse of $J_{\lambda,n}$ is:
$$J_{\lambda,n}^{-1} = \sum_{k=0}^{n-1}\frac{(-Z)^k}{\lambda^{k+1}} =
\begin{bmatrix}
\lambda^{-1} & -\lambda^{-2} & \,\,\,\lambda^{-3} & \cdots & -(-\lambda)^{1-n} & \,-(-\lambda)^{-n} \\
0      & \;\;\;\lambda^{-1} & -\lambda^{-2} & \cdots & -(-\lambda)^{2-n} & -(-\lambda)^{1-n} \\
0      & 0      & \,\,\,\lambda^{-1} & \cdots & -(-\lambda)^{3-n} & -(-\lambda)^{2-n} \\
\vdots & \vdots & \vdots & \ddots & \vdots     & \vdots \\
0      & 0      & 0      & \cdots & \lambda^{-1} & -\lambda^{-2} \\
0      & 0      & 0      & \cdots & 0          & \lambda^{-1} \\
\end{bmatrix}.$$

Also, spec f(A) = f (spec A); that is, every eigenvalue $\lambda\in\mathrm{spec}A$ corresponds to the eigenvalue $f(\lambda) \in \operatorname{spec}f(A)$, but it has, in general, different algebraic multiplicity, geometric multiplicity and index. However, the algebraic multiplicity may be computed as follows:
$$\text{mul}_{f(A)}f(\lambda)=\sum_{\mu\in\text{spec}A\cap f^{-1}(f(\lambda))}~\text{mul}_A \mu.$$

The function f (T) of a linear transformation T between vector spaces can be defined in a similar way according to the holomorphic functional calculus, where Banach space and Riemann surface theories play a fundamental role. In the case of finite-dimensional spaces, both theories perfectly match.

== Dynamical systems ==
Now suppose a (complex) dynamical system is simply defined by the equation
$$\begin{align}
\dot{\mathbf{z}}(t)&=A(\mathbf{c})\mathbf{z}(t), \\
\mathbf{z}(0) &=\mathbf{z}_0 \in\Complex^n,
\end{align}$$

where $\mathbf{z}:\R_+ \to \mathcal{R}$ is the (n-dimensional) curve parametrization of an orbit on the Riemann surface $\mathcal{R}$ of the dynamical system, whereas A(c) is an n × n complex matrix whose elements are complex functions of a d-dimensional parameter $\mathbf{c} \in \Complex^d$.

Even if $A\in\mathbb{M}_n \left(\mathrm{C}^0\left(\Complex^d\right)\right)$ (that is, A continuously depends on the parameter c) the Jordan normal form of the matrix is continuously deformed almost everywhere on $\Complex^d$ but, in general, not everywhere: there is some critical submanifold of $\Complex^d$ on which the Jordan form abruptly changes its structure whenever the parameter crosses or simply "travels" around it (monodromy). Such changes mean that several Jordan blocks (either belonging to different eigenvalues or not) join to a unique Jordan block, or vice versa (that is, one Jordan block splits into two or more different ones). Many aspects of bifurcation theory for both continuous and discrete dynamical systems can be interpreted with the analysis of functional Jordan matrices.

From the tangent space dynamics, this means that the orthogonal decomposition of the dynamical system's phase space changes and, for example, different orbits gain periodicity, or lose it, or shift from a certain kind of periodicity to another (such as period-doubling, cfr. logistic map).

In a sentence, the qualitative behaviour of such a dynamical system may substantially change as the versal deformation of the Jordan normal form of A(c).

== Linear ordinary differential equations ==
The simplest example of a dynamical system is a system of linear, constant-coefficient, ordinary differential equations; that is, let $A\in\mathbb{M}_n (\Complex)$ and $\mathbf{z}_0 \in \Complex^n$:
$$\begin{align}
\dot{\mathbf{z}}(t) &= A\mathbf{z}(t), \\
\mathbf{z}(0) &= \mathbf{z}_0,
\end{align}$$
whose direct closed-form solution involves computation of the matrix exponential:
$$\mathbf{z}(t)=e^{tA}\mathbf{z}_0.$$

Another way, provided the solution is restricted to the local Lebesgue space of n-dimensional vector fields $\mathbf{z}\in\mathrm{L}_{\mathrm{loc}}^1 (\R_+)^n$, is to use its Laplace transform $\mathbf{Z}(s) = \mathcal{L}[\mathbf{z}](s)$. In this case
$$\mathbf{Z}(s)=\left(sI-A\right)^{-1}\mathbf{z}_0.$$

The matrix function (A − sI)^{−1} is called the resolvent matrix of the differential operator $\frac{\mathrm{d}}{\mathrm{d}t}-A$. It is meromorphic with respect to the complex parameter $s \in \Complex$ since its matrix elements are rational functions whose denominator is equal for all to det(A − sI). Its polar singularities are the eigenvalues of A, whose order equals their index for it; that is, $\mathrm{ord}_{(A-sI)^{-1}}\lambda=\mathrm{idx}_A \lambda$.

== See also ==
- Jordan decomposition
- Jordan normal form
- Holomorphic functional calculus
- Matrix exponential
- Logarithm of a matrix
- Dynamical system
- Bifurcation theory
- State space (controls)
