= Charles L. Dolph =

American educator

Charles Laurie Dolph (August 27, 1918 – June 1, 1994) was an American mathematician known for his research in applied mathematics and engineering.

== Biography ==
Dolph graduated from the University of Michigan with A.B. in 1939 and from Princeton University with M.A. in 1941 and Ph.D. in 1944. His thesis advisor was Salomon Bochner. Dolph was from 1943 to 1944 a physicist in the U.S. Naval Research Laboratory and from 1944 to 1945 an ensign in the U.S. Navy.

While serving with the U.S. Navy during World War II, Dolph was part of a team of scientists who developed an IFF ("Identification: Friend or Foe") radar system, which is still used by military and civilian aircraft today. Dolph’s early research on antenna arrays was instrumental to the founding of Hughes Electronics.

From 1945 to 1946 Dolph worked for Michigan Bell Telephone Laboratories. In 1946 he joined the University of Michigan faculty as a lecturer with a joint appointment in the department of mathematics and in the department of engineering research at the Engineering Research Institute. At the University of Michigan's department of mathematics he became in 1947 an assistant professor, in 1954 an associate professor, and in 1960 a full professor, retiring in 1988 as professor emeritus.

His research covered a wide range of problems in applied mathematics—including antenna theory, compressible fluid flow, shock problems, stochastic processes, plasma physics, atmospheric science, scattering theory, singular expansion methods and non-self-adjoint operators.

In 1982 Dolph, an Ann Arbor native, and his first wife donated the land for the Dolph Park Nature Area to the City of Ann Arbor. The land, consisting of 57 acres with 2 lakes, was originally owned by his parents.

He directed four doctoral theses and was three times a visiting professor at German universities. He was an associate editor for the Journal of Mathematical Analysis and Applications.

In 1944 in New Jersey, Dolph married Marjorie Louise Tibert (1918–2010). They divorced after three of their four children died, and Dolph remarried. He died in 1994.

== Awards and honors ==
- 1946 Thompson Prize from the Institute of Radio Engineers
- 1947 J. Browder Thompson Award from the Institute of Electrical and Electronics Engineers
- 1957–58 Guggenheim Fellowship, spent as a sabbatical year at the Technical Universities of Munich and Aachen

== Selected publications ==
- Dolph, C.L. (1946). "A Current Distribution for Broadside Arrays Which Optimizes the Relationship between Beam Width and Side-Lobe Level". Proceedings of the IRE. 34 (6): 335–348. Bibcode:1946PIRE...34..335D. doi:10.1109/JRPROC.1946.225956. S2CID 51638604.
- Dolph, C. L. (1949). "Nonlinear Integral Equations of the Hammerstein Type". Transactions of the American Mathematical Society. 66 (2): 289–307. doi:10.2307/1990583. JSTOR 1990583.
- Dolph, C. L.; Woodbury, M. A. (1952). "On the Relation Between Green's Functions and Covariances of Certain Stochastic Processes and Its Application to Unbiased Linear Prediction". Transactions of the American Mathematical Society. 72 (3): 519. doi:10.2307/1990716. JSTOR 1990716.
- Dolph, C. L. (1954). "On the Timoshenko theory of transverse beam vibrations" (PDF). Quarterly of Applied Mathematics. 12 (2): 175–187. doi:10.1090/qam/62620.
- Churchill, R. V.; Dolph, C. L. (1954). "Inverse Transforms of Products of Legendre Transforms". Proceedings of the American Mathematical Society. 5 (1): 93–100. doi:10.1090/S0002-9939-1954-0062872-4. JSTOR 2032112.
- Dolph, C. L.; McLaughlin, J. E.; Marx, I. (1954). "Symmetric linear transformations and complex quadratic forms". Communications on Pure and Applied Mathematics. 7 (4): 621–632. doi:10.1002/cpa.3160070402. ISSN 0010-3640.
- Barrar, R. B.; Dolph, C. L. (1954). "On a Three Dimensional Transmission Problem of Electromagnetic Theory". Journal of Rational Mechanics and Analysis. 3: 725–743. JSTOR 24900311.
- Dolph, C. L. (1957). "A Saddle Point Characterization of the Schwinger Stationary Points in Exterior Scattering Problems". Journal of the Society for Industrial and Applied Mathematics. 5 (3): 89–104. doi:10.1137/0105008.
- Dolph, C. L.; Lewis, D. C. (1958). "On the application of infinite systems of ordinary differential equations to perturbations of plane Poiseuille flow" (PDF). Quarterly of Applied Mathematics. 16 (2): 97–110. doi:10.1090/qam/93242.
- Dolph, C. L. (1961). "Recent developments in some non-self-adjoint problems of mathematical physics". Bulletin of the American Mathematical Society. 67: 1–70. doi:10.1090/S0002-9904-1961-10493-X.
- Dolph, C.L.; Weil, H. (1961). "On the change in radar cross-section of a spherical satellite caused by a plasma sheath". Planetary and Space Science. 6: 123–132. Bibcode:1961P&SS....6..123D. doi:10.1016/0032-0633(61)90012-5. hdl:2027.42/32362. ISSN 0032-0633.
- Dolph, C. L. (1962). "A unified theory of the nonlinear oscillations of a cold plasma". Journal of Mathematical Analysis and Applications. 5: 94–118. doi:10.1016/0022-247X(62)90007-0. hdl:2027.42/32294.
- Dolph, C. L.; McLeod, J. B.; Thoe, D. (1966). "The analytic continuation of the resolvent kernel and scattering operator associated with the Schroedinger operator" (PDF). Journal of Mathematical Analysis and Applications. 16 (2): 311–332. doi:10.1016/0022-247X(66)90174-0.
- Dolph, Charles L. (1969). "The integral equation method in scattering theory". Problems in Analysis: A Symposium in Honor of Salomon Bochner. Princeton University Press. pp. 201–227. ISBN 9781400869312.
- Derome, Jacques; Dolph, C. L. (1970). "Three-dimensional non-geostrophic disturbances in a baroclinic zonal flow". Geophysical Fluid Dynamics. 1 (1–2): 91–122. Bibcode:1970GeoFD...1...91D. doi:10.1080/03091927009365769.
- Dolph, C. L.; Komkov, V.; Scott, R. A. (1980). "A critique of the singularity expansion and eigenmode expansion methods" (PDF). In Varadan, VK; Varadan, VV (eds.). Acoustic, Electromagnetic, and Elastic Wave Scattering—Focus on the T-Matrix Approach: International Symposium Held at the Ohio State University, Columbus, Ohio, USA, June 25-27, 1979 (sponsored by U.S. Office of Naval Research). Oxford: Pergamon Press. ISBN 978-0-08-025096-0.
- Ramm, A. G.; Dolph, C. L. (1980). "On the quasi-static boundary value problem of electrodynamics" (PDF). Journal of Mathematical Analysis and Applications. 75 (2): 300–305. doi:10.1016/0022-247X(80)90081-5. hdl:2027.42/23230.
- Dolph, C. L.; Ramm, A. G (1981). "Nonselfadjoint Operators in Diffraction and Scattering". In Gustafson K.E.; Reinhardt W.P. (eds.). Quantum Mechanics in Mathematics, Chemistry, and Physics. Springer, Boston, MA. pp. 179–182. doi:10.1007/978-1-4613-3258-9_12. hdl:2027.42/50168. ISBN 978-1-4613-3260-2.
