= Phase space crystal =

State of a physical system in phase space

Phase space crystal is the state of a physical system that displays discrete symmetry in phase space instead of real space. For a single-particle system, the phase space crystal state refers to the eigenstate of the Hamiltonian for a closed quantum system or the eigenoperator of the Liouvillian for an open quantum system. For a many-body system, phase space crystal is the solid-like crystalline state in phase space. The general framework of phase space crystals is to extend the study of solid state physics and condensed matter physics into phase space of dynamical systems. While real space has Euclidean geometry, phase space is embedded with classical symplectic geometry or quantum noncommutative geometry.

== Phase space lattices ==
In his celebrated book Mathematical Foundations of Quantum Mechanics, John von Neumann constructed a phase space lattice by two commutative elementary displacement operators along position and momentum directions respectively, which is also called the von Neumann lattice nowadays. If the phase space is replaced a frequency-time plane, the von Neumann lattice is called Gabor lattice and widely used for signal processing.

The phase space lattice differs fundamentally from the real space lattice because the two coordinates of phase space are noncommutative in quantum mechanics. As a result, a coherent state moving along a closed path in phase space acquires an additional phase factor, which is similar to the Aharonov–Bohm effect of a charged particle moving in a magnetic field. There is a deep connection between phase space and magnetic field. In fact, the canonical equation of motion can also be rewritten in the Lorenz-force form reflecting the symplectic geometry of classical phase space.

In the phase space of dynamical systems, the stable points together with their neighbouring regions form the so-called Poincaré-Birkhoff islands in the chaotic sea that may form a chain or some regular two dimensional lattice structures in phase space. For example, the effective Hamiltonian of kicked harmonic oscillator (KHO). can possess square lattice, triangle lattice and even quasi-crystal structures in phase space depending on the ratio of kicking number. In fact, any arbitrary phase space lattice can be engineered by selecting an appropriate kicking sequence for the KHO.

== Phase space crystals (PSC) ==
The concept of phase space crystal was proposed by Guo et al. and originally refers to the eigenstate of effective Hamiltonian of periodically driven (Floquet) dynamical system. Depending on whether interaction effect is included, phase space crystals can be classified into single-particle PSC and many-body PSC.

=== Single-particle phase space crystals ===
Depending on the symmetry in phase space, phase space crystal can be a one-dimensional (1D) state with $n$-fold rotational symmetry in phase space or two-dimensional (2D) lattice state extended into the whole phase space. The concept of phase space crystal for a closed system has been extended into open quantum systems and is named as dissipative phase space crystals.

==== Z_{n} PSC ====
Phase space is fundamentally different from real space as the two coordinates of phase space do not commute, i.e., $[\hat{x},\hat{p}]=i\lambda$ where $\lambda$ is the dimensionless Planck constant. The ladder operator is defined as $\hat{a}=(\hat{x}+i\hat{p})/\sqrt{2\lambda}$ such that $[\hat{a},\hat{a}^\dagger]=1$. The Hamiltonian of a physical system $\hat{H}=H(\hat{x},\hat{p})$ can also be written in a function of ladder operators $\hat{H}=H(\hat{a},\hat{a}^\dagger)$. By defining the rotational operator in phase space by $\hat{T}_\tau=e^{-i\tau \hat{a}^\dagger \hat{a}}$ where $\tau={2\pi}/{n}$ with $n$ a positive integer, the system has $n$-fold rotational symmetry or $Z_n$ symmetry if the Hamiltonian commutates with rotational operator $[\hat{H},\hat{T}_\tau]=0$, i.e.,
$$\hat{H}=\hat{T}^\dagger_\tau\hat{H}\hat{T}_\tau \rightarrow H(\hat{a},\hat{a}^\dagger)=H(\hat{T}^\dagger_\tau\hat{a}\hat{T}_\tau,\hat{T}^\dagger_\tau\hat{H}\hat{a}^\dagger_\tau)=H(\hat{a}e^{-i\tau},\hat{a}^\dagger e^{i\tau}).$$
In this case, one can apply Bloch theorem to the $n$-fold symmetric Hamiltonian and calculate the band structure. The discrete rotational symmetric structure of Hamiltonian is called $Z_n$ phase space lattice and the corresponding eigenstates are called $Z_n$ phase space crystals.

==== Lattice PSC ====
The discrete rotational symmetry can be extended to the discrete translational symmetry in the whole phase space. For such purpose, the displacement operator in phase space is defined by $\hat{D}(\xi)=\exp[(\xi\hat{a}^\dagger-\xi^*\hat{a})/\sqrt{2\lambda}]$ which has the property $\hat{D}^\dagger(\xi)\hat{a}\hat{D}(\xi)=\hat{a}+\xi$, where $\xi$ is a complex number corresponding to the displacement vector in phase space. The system has discrete translational symmetry if the Hamiltonian commutates with translational operator $[\hat{H},\hat{D}^\dagger(\xi)]=0$, i.e.,
$$\hat{H}=\hat{D}^\dagger(\xi)\hat{H}\hat{D}(\xi) \rightarrow H(\hat{a},\hat{a}^\dagger)=H(\hat{D}^\dagger(\xi)\hat{a}\hat{D}(\xi),\hat{D}^\dagger\hat{a}^\dagger\hat{D}(\xi))=H(\hat{a}+\xi,\hat{a}^\dagger+\xi^*).$$
If there exist two elementary displacements $\hat{D}(\xi_1)$ and $\hat{D}(\xi_2)$ that satisfy the above condition simultaneously, the phase space Hamiltonian possesses 2D lattice symmetry in phase space. However, the two displacement operators are not commutative in general $[\hat{D}(\xi_1),\hat{D}(\xi_2)]\neq 0$. In the non-commutative phase space, the concept of a "point" is meaningless. Instead, a coherent state $|\alpha\rangle$ is defined as the eigenstate of the lowering operator via $\hat{a}|\alpha\rangle=\alpha|\alpha\rangle$. The displacement operator displaces the coherent state with an additional phase, i.e., $\hat{D}(\xi)|\alpha\rangle=e^{i\mathrm{Im}(\xi\alpha^*)}|\alpha+\xi\rangle$. A coherent state that is moved along a closed path, e.g., a triangle with three edges given by $(\xi_1,\xi_2,-\xi_1-\xi_2)$ in phase space, acquires a geometric phase factor $\hat{D}[-\xi_1-\xi_2]\hat{D}(\xi_2)\hat{D}(\xi_1)|\alpha\rangle=e^{i\frac{S}{\lambda}}|\alpha\rangle,$ where $S=\frac{1}{2}\mathrm{Im}(\xi_2\xi^*_1)$ is the enclosed area. This geometric phase is analogous to the Aharonov–Bohm phase of charged particle in a magnetic field. If the magnetic unit cell and the lattice unit cell are commensurable, namely, there exist two integers $r$ and $s$ such that $[\hat{D}^r(\xi_1),\hat{D}^s(\xi_2)]=0$, one can calculate the band structure defined in a 2D Brillouin. For example, the spectrum of a square phase space lattice Hamiltonian $\hat{H}=\cos\hat{x}+\cos\hat{p}$ displays Hofstadter's butterfly band structure that describes the hopping of charged particles between tight-binding lattice sites in a magnetic field. In this case, the eigenstates are called 2D lattice phase space crystals.

==== Dissipative PSC ====
The concept of phase space crystals for closed quantum system has been extended to open quantum system. In circuit QED systems, a microwave resonator combined with Josephson junctions and voltage bias under $n$-photon resonance can be described by a rotating wave approximation (RWA) Hamiltonian $\hat{H}_{RWA}$ with $Z_n$ phase space symmetry described above. When single-photon loss is dominant, the dissipative dynamics of resonator is described by the following master equation (Lindblad equation)
$$\frac{d\rho}{dt}=-\frac{i}{\hbar}[\hat{H}_{RWA},\rho]+\frac{\gamma}{2}(2\hat{a}\rho\hat{a}^{\dagger}-\hat{a}^{\dagger}\hat{a}\rho-\rho\hat{a}^{\dagger}\hat{a})=\mathcal{L}(\rho),$$
where $\gamma$ is the loss rate and superoperator $\mathcal{L}$ is called the Liouvillian. One can calculate the eigenspectrum and corresponding eigenoperators of the Liouvillian of the system $\mathcal{L}\hat{\rho}_m=\lambda_m\hat{\rho}_m$. Notice that not only the Hamiltonian but also the Liouvillian both are invariant under the $n$-fold rotational operation, i.e., $[\mathcal{L},\mathcal{T}_\tau]=0$ with $\mathcal{T}_\tau\hat{O}=\hat{T}^\dagger_\tau\hat{O}\hat{T}_\tau$ and $\tau={2\pi}/{n}$. This symmetry plays a crucial role in extending the concept of phase space crystals to an open quantum system. As a result, the Liouvillian eigenoperators $\hat{\rho}_m$ have a Bloch mode structure in phase space, which is called a dissipative phase space crystal.

=== Many-body phase space crystals ===
The concept of phase space crystal can be extended to systems of interacting particles where it refers to the many-body state having a solid-like crystalline structure in phase space. In this case, the interaction of particles plays an important role. In real space, the many-body Hamiltonian subjected to a perturbative periodic drive (with period $T$) is given by
$$\mathcal{H}=\sum_iH(x_i,p_i,t)+\sum_{i<j}V(x_i-x_j).$$
Usually, the interaction potential $V(x_i-x_j)$ is a function of two particles' distance in real space. By transforming to the rotating frame with the driving frequency and adapting rotating wave approximation (RWA), one can get the effective Hamiltonian.
$$\mathcal{H}_{RWA}=\sum_iH_{RWA}(X_i,P_i,t)+\sum_{i<j}U(X_i,P_i;X_j,P_j).$$
Here, $X_i, P_i$ are the stroboscopic position and momentum of $i$-th particle, namely, they take the values of $x_i(t), p_i(t)$ at the integer multiple of driving period $t=nT$. To have the crystal structure in phase space, the effective interaction in phase space needs to be invariant under the discrete rotational or translational operations in phase space.

==== Phase space interactions ====
In classical dynamics, to the leading order, the effective interaction potential in phase space is the time-averaged real space interaction in one driving period
$$U_{ij}=\frac{1}{T}\int^T_0V[x_i(t)-x_j(t)].$$
Here, $x_i(t)$ represents the trajectory of $i$-th particle in the absence of driving field. For the model power-law interaction potential $V(x_i-x_j)=\epsilon^{2n}/|x_i-x_j|^{2n}$ with integers and half-integers $n\geq 1/2$, the direct integral given by the above time-average formula is divergent, i.e., $U_{ij}=\infty.$ A renormalisation procedure was introduced to remove the divergence and the correct phase space interaction is a function of phase space distance $R_{ij}$ in the $(X_i,P_i)$ plane. For the Coulomb potential $n=1/2$, the result $U(R_{ij})=2\pi^{-1}\tilde{\epsilon}/R_{ij}$ still keeps the form of Coulomb's law up to a logarithmic renormalised "charge" $\tilde{\epsilon}=\epsilon\ln (\epsilon^{-1}e^2 R^3_{ij}/2)$, where $e=2.71828\cdots$ is the Euler's number. For $n=1,3/2,2,5/2,\cdots$, the renormalised phase space interaction potential is $U_{ij}=U(R_{ij})=\frac{2\epsilon\gamma^{2n-1}4^{\frac{1}{2n}-1}}{\pi(2n-1)}R^{1-\frac{1}{n}}_{ij},$ where $\gamma=(4n-1)^{\frac{1}{2n-1}}$ is the collision factor. For the special case of $n=1$, there is no effective interaction in phase space since $U(R_{ij})=\sqrt{3}\epsilon\pi^{-1}$ is a constant with respect to phase space distance. In general for the case of $n>1$, phase space interaction ${U}(R_{ij})$ grows with the phase space distance $R_{ij}$. For the hard-sphere interaction ($n\rightarrow\infty$), phase space interaction $U(R_{ij})=\epsilon\pi^{-1}R_{ij}$ behaves like the confinement interaction between quarks in Quantum chromodynamics (QCD). The above phase space interaction is indeed invariant under the discrete rotational or translational operations in phase space. Combined with the phase space lattice potential from driving, there exist a stable regime where the particles arrange themselves periodically in phase space giving rise to many-body phase space crystals.

In quantum mechanics, the point particle is replaced by a quantum wave packet and the divergence problem is naturally avoided. To the lowest-order Magnus expansion for Floquet system, the quantum phase space interaction of two particles is the time-averaged real space interaction over the periodic two-body quantum state $\Phi(x_i,x_j,t)$ as follows.
$$U_{ij}=\frac{1}{T}\int^T_0\langle \Phi(x_i,x_j,t) |V(x_i-x_j)|\Phi(x_i,x_j,t)\rangle.$$
In the coherent state representation, the quantum phase space interaction approaches the classical phase space interaction in the long-distance limit. For $N$ bosonic ultracold atoms with repulsive contact interaction bouncing on an oscillating mirror, it is possible to form Mott insulator-like state in the $Z_n$ phase space lattice. In this case, there is a well defined number of particles in each potential site which can be viewed as an example of 1D many-body phase space crystal.

If the two indistinguishable particles have spins, the total phase space interaction can be written in a sum of direct interaction and exchange interaction. This means that the exchange effect during the collision of two particles can induce an effective spin-spin interaction.

==== Phase space crystal vibrations ====
Solid crystals are defined by a periodic arrangement of atoms in real space, atoms subject to a time-periodic drive can also form crystals in phase space. The interactions between these atoms give rise to collective vibrational modes similar to phonons in solid crystals. The honeycomb phase space crystal is particularly interesting because the vibrational band structure has two sub-lattice bands that can have nontrivial topological physics. The vibrations of any two atoms are coupled via a pairing interaction with intrinsically complex couplings. Their complex phases have a simple geometrical interpretation and can not be eliminated by a gauge transformation, leading to a vibrational band structure with non-trivial Chern numbers and chiral edge states in phase space. In contrast to all topological transport scenarios in real space, the chiral transport for phase space phonons can arise without breaking physical time-reversal symmetry.

== Relation to time crystals ==
Time crystals and phase space crystals are closely related but different concepts. They both study subharmonic modes that emerge in periodically driven systems. Time crystals focus on the spontaneous symmetry breaking process of discrete time translational symmetry (DTTS) and the protection mechanism of subharmonic modes in quantum many-body systems. In contrast, the study of phase space crystal focuses on the discrete symmetries in phase space. The basic modes constructing a phase space crystal are not necessarily a many-body state, and need not break DTTS as for the single-particle phase space crystals. For many-body systems, phase space crystals study the interplay of the potential subharmonic modes that are arranged periodically in phase space. There is a trend to study the interplay of multiple time crystals which is coined as condensed matter physics in time crystals.
