= QEP =

QEP may refer to:

- Quadrature encoder pulse, in a rotary encoder
- Query plan or query execution plan, in a database software system
- Quadratic eigenvalue problem, a special case of nonlinear eigenproblem in mathematics
- QEP Resources, a defunct American energy company.
