= Nonlinear eigenproblem =

Type of equation involving matrix-valued functions

In mathematics, a nonlinear eigenproblem, sometimes nonlinear eigenvalue problem, is a generalization of the (ordinary) eigenvalue problem to equations that depend nonlinearly on the eigenvalue. Specifically, it refers to equations of the form

$$M (\lambda) x = 0 ,$$

where $x\neq0$ is a vector, and $M$ is a matrix-valued function of the number $\lambda$. The number $\lambda$ is known as the (nonlinear) eigenvalue, the vector $x$ as the (nonlinear) eigenvector, and $(\lambda,x)$ as the eigenpair. The matrix $M (\lambda)$ is singular at an eigenvalue $\lambda$.

== Definition ==
In the discipline of numerical linear algebra the following definition is typically used.

Let $\Omega \subseteq \Complex$, and let $M : \Omega \rightarrow \Complex^{n\times n}$ be a function that maps scalars to matrices. A scalar $\lambda \in \Complex$ is called an eigenvalue, and a nonzero vector $x \in \Complex^n$ is called a right eigenvector if $M (\lambda) x = 0$. Moreover, a nonzero vector $y \in \Complex^n$ is called a left eigenvector if $y^H M (\lambda) = 0^H$, where the superscript $^H$ denotes the Hermitian transpose. The definition of the eigenvalue is equivalent to $\det(M (\lambda)) = 0$, where $\det()$ denotes the determinant.

The function $M$ is usually required to be a holomorphic function of $\lambda$ (in some domain $\Omega$).

In general, $M (\lambda)$ could be a linear map, but most commonly it is a finite-dimensional, usually square, matrix.

Definition: The problem is said to be regular if there exists a $z\in\Omega$ such that $\det(M (z)) \neq 0$. Otherwise it is said to be singular.

Definition: An eigenvalue $\lambda$ is said to have algebraic multiplicity $k$ if $k$ is the smallest integer such that the $k$th derivative of $\det(M (z))$ with respect to $z$, in $\lambda$ is nonzero. In formulas that $\left.\frac{d^k \det(M (z))}{d z^k} \right|_{z=\lambda} \neq 0$ but $\left.\frac{d^\ell \det(M (z))}{d z^\ell} \right|_{z=\lambda} = 0$ for $\ell=0,1,2,\dots, k-1$.

Definition: The geometric multiplicity of an eigenvalue $\lambda$ is the dimension of the nullspace of $M (\lambda)$.

== Special cases ==
The following examples are special cases of the nonlinear eigenproblem.

- The (ordinary) eigenvalue problem: $M (\lambda) = A-\lambda I.$
- The generalized eigenvalue problem: $M (\lambda) = A-\lambda B.$
- The quadratic eigenvalue problem: $M (\lambda) = A_0 + \lambda A_1 + \lambda^2 A_2.$
- The polynomial eigenvalue problem: $M (\lambda) = \sum_{i=0}^m \lambda^i A_i.$
- The rational eigenvalue problem: $M (\lambda) = \sum_{i=0}^{m_1} A_i \lambda^i + \sum_{i=1}^{m_2} B_i r_i(\lambda),$ where $r_i(\lambda)$ are rational functions.
- The delay eigenvalue problem: $M (\lambda) = -I\lambda + A_0 +\sum_{i=1}^m A_i e^{-\tau_i \lambda},$ where $\tau_1,\tau_2,\dots,\tau_m$ are given scalars, known as delays.

== Jordan chains ==
Definition: Let $(\lambda_0,x_0)$ be an eigenpair. A tuple of vectors $(x_0,x_1,\dots, x_{r-1})\in\Complex^n\times\Complex^n\times\dots\times\Complex^n$ is called a Jordan chain if
$$\sum_{k=0}^{\ell} M^{(k)} (\lambda_0) x_{\ell - k} = 0 ,$$
for $\ell = 0,1,\dots , r-1$, where $M^{(k)}(\lambda_0)$ denotes the $k$th derivative of $M$ with respect to $\lambda$ and evaluated in $\lambda=\lambda_0$. The vectors $x_0,x_1,\dots, x_{r-1}$ are called generalized eigenvectors, $r$ is called the length of the Jordan chain, and the maximal length a Jordan chain starting with $x_0$ is called the rank of $x_0$.

Theorem: A tuple of vectors $(x_0,x_1,\dots, x_{r-1})\in\Complex^n\times\Complex^n\times\dots\times\Complex^n$ is a Jordan chain if and only if the function $M(\lambda) \chi_\ell (\lambda)$ has a root in $\lambda=\lambda_0$ and the root is of multiplicity at least $\ell$ for $\ell=0,1,\dots,r-1$, where the vector valued function $\chi_\ell (\lambda)$ is defined as
$$\chi_\ell(\lambda) = \sum_{k=0}^\ell x_k (\lambda-\lambda_0)^k.$$

== Mathematical software ==
- The eigenvalue solver package SLEPc contains C-implementations of many numerical methods for nonlinear eigenvalue problems.
- The NLEVP collection of nonlinear eigenvalue problems is a MATLAB package containing many nonlinear eigenvalue problems with various properties.
- The FEAST eigenvalue solver is a software package for standard eigenvalue problems as well as nonlinear eigenvalue problems, designed from density-matrix representation in quantum mechanics combined with contour integration techniques.
- The MATLAB toolbox NLEIGS contains an implementation of fully rational Krylov with a dynamically constructed rational interpolant.
- The MATLAB toolbox CORK contains an implementation of the compact rational Krylov algorithm that exploits the Kronecker structure of the linearization pencils.
- The MATLAB toolbox AAA-EIGS contains an implementation of CORK with rational approximation by set-valued AAA.
- The MATLAB toolbox RKToolbox (Rational Krylov Toolbox) contains implementations of the rational Krylov method for nonlinear eigenvalue problems as well as features for rational approximation.
- The Julia package NEP-PACK contains many implementations of various numerical methods for nonlinear eigenvalue problems, as well as many benchmark problems.
- The review paper of Güttel & Tisseur contains MATLAB code snippets implementing basic Newton-type methods and contour integration methods for nonlinear eigenproblems.

== Eigenvector nonlinearity ==
Eigenvector nonlinearities is a related, but different, form of nonlinearity that is sometimes studied. In this case the function $M$ maps vectors to matrices, or sometimes hermitian matrices to hermitian matrices.
