= Karl Edwin Gustafson =

American mathematician

Academic background
- Education: University of Maryland

Academic work
- Discipline: Mathematics
- Sub-discipline: Applied mathematics
- Institutions: University of Colorado, Boulder
- Website: https://euclid.colorado.edu/~gustafs/

Karl Edwin Gustafson is an American mathematician. Gustafson spent most of his career at the University of Colorado, Boulder, in the Department of Mathematics. He is known for developing the antieigenvalue theory in applied mathematics.

== Education and career ==
Gustafson received two Bachelor of Science degrees from the University of Colorado in 1958 (Engineering Physics/Applied Mathematics and Business Finance) before a PhD in Mathematics in 1965 from the University of Maryland. He performed post-doctoral work in Switzerland and Italy as a recipient of an NSF-NATO grant, held an assistant professor position at the University of Minnesota, and then moved back to Colorado where he was Associate Professor and then Professor of Mathematics at the University of Colorado for over 50 years. He retired as Professor Emeritus in 2020.

== Scholarship ==
Gustafson published articles and books in many areas of mathematics, both applied and pure, and in physics and the mathematics of finance. Early in his career he developed the antieigenvalue theory in the area of applied mathematics. He returned to this topic in 2012 with a book exploring how the theory applies in the contexts of numerical analysis, wavelets, statistics, quantum mechanics, finance and optimization. Gustafson wrote an introductory guide to partial differential equations (Introduction to Partial Differential Equations and Hilbert Space Methods) that was published in three editions in the United States and in various versions in three foreign countries. Gustafson also published academic books in other areas of mathematics and in related subjects such as quantum mechanics and fluid dynamics. In 2022, he became the honoree of an endowed faculty chair at the University of Colorado. The funds for the chair came from an anonymous donor who was a former student of Gustafson's. The chair will be known as the Karl Gustafson Endowed Chair of Quantum Engineering and will be embedded in the Department of Electrical, Computer and Energy Engineering within the College of Engineering and Applied Sciences, at Gustafson's request. Gustafson proposed that the chair be part of the College of Engineering in hopes that the faculty who hold the chair might have a "fundamental breakthrough in some way other than just writing papers," according to Gustafson.

== Other publications and pursuits ==
Gustafson also had many interests outside of academia. As a young rock climber in Colorado in the 1950s, Gustafson and colleagues were at the forefront of the sport of free climbing and completed several first ascents of local rock faces and mountain ridges in the area (North Face of The Matron, North Face of Schmoe's Nose and the Snowmass-Capitol Ridge). Gustafson published a memoir in 2012, entitled The Crossing of Heaven, which recounted, among other life experiences, more of his mountaineering adventures and his role in top-secret (at the time) military intelligence work during the Cold War, including writing the software in 1960 for the first US spy satellite. After surviving a hemorrhagic stroke in 2016, Gustafson wrote a second memoir, Reverberations of a Stroke, concerning his medical recovery and return to teaching mathematics at the university.
