= Alexander Ramm =

American mathematician (born 1940)

Alexander G. Ramm (born 1940 in St. Petersburg, Russia) is an American mathematician. His research focuses on differential and integral equations, operator theory, ill-posed and inverse problems, scattering theory, functional analysis, spectral theory, numerical analysis, theoretical electrical engineering, signal estimation, and tomography.

== Education and career ==
Ramm obtained a B.S. degree in mathematics in 1959 and an M.S. degree in 1961 both at Leningrad State University. He received a Ph.D. degree from Moscow State University in 1964 and Dr. Sci. in 1972 at the Mathematics Institute Academy of Science, Minsk.

Ramm taught at Leningrad Institute of Precision Mechanics and Optics from 1962 to 1979. He was a visiting professor and research scientist at the University of Michigan in 1979–1981. He has been a professor at Kansas State University since 1981, and lectured at many universities and research centers around the world. He is currently professor emeritus.

== Awards and honors ==
Ramm received Distinguished Graduate faculty award in 1996 and received Khwarizmi International Award for mathematical research in 2004. He was a distinguished foreign professor at the Academy of Science of Mexico (1997), research CNRS professor in France (2003), distinguished visiting professor at the University of Cairo (2004, 2006), distinguished visiting professor supported by the UK Royal Academy of Engineering (2009). He was a Mercator Professor in 2007, Distinguished HKSTAM speaker (2005), London Mathematical Society speaker (2005). Ramm was a Fulbright Research Professor in Israel (Technion) in 1991–1992, an invited plenary speaker at 7th PACOM in 2009. He was a visiting professor at IMPAN in 2010, at MPI (Max Planck Institute) in 2011, at Beijing Institute of Technology (BIT) in 2013, a Fulbright Research Professor at the University of Lviv, Ukraine, in 2015. Ramm was an elected member of Electromagnetic Academy, MIT (June 1990) and a member of New York Academy of Science. He has been an associated editor of many professional journals.

== Research ==
Ramm's work can be divided into the following areas:

1. PDE, ODE and integral equations,
2. spectral and scattering theory for differential operators, especially for Schrödinger operators,
3. static problems and wave scattering by small bodies of arbitrary shapes,
4. random fields estimation theory,
5. nonlinear passive systems,
6. inverse scattering problems
7. theoretical numerical analysis and ill-posed problems,
8. nonselfadjoint operators and their applications in scattering theory,
9. signal and image processing,
10. local tomography,
11. mathematical geophysics,
12. electromagnetic theory and mathematical physics,
13. creating materials with a desired refraction coefficient,
14. symmetry problems for PDE,
15. Navier-Stokes problem in $\mathbb{R}^3$,
16. inverse scattering with non-over-determined scattering data.

Highlights of Ramm's research are:

1. In a long series of papers starting with a thorough study of the spectral properties and eigenfunction expansions is given for the first time for Schrödinger operators in domains with infinite boundaries;
2. Iterative methods are developed for solving interior and exterior boundary value problems for Laplace's equation, analytic formulas for the S-matrix for acoustic and electromagnetic wave scattering by small bodies of arbitrary shapes are derived and applied successfully to numerical and physical problems (see);
3. Analytic theory of random fields estimation was developed in monograph which is an original detailed study of a new class of multidimensional integral equations basic in estimation theory. No results of this type had been known prior the work of Ramm. This monograph was translated into Russian by MIR publishing house in 1996. Many results known for one-dimensional estimation theory are very particular cases of the general theory developed in the monograph. The theory has many applications in signal processing, and in geophysics in particular.
4. In the papers and (also,) the mathematical foundations of the EEM and SEM methods are given. These methods are now very popular in electrical engineering sciences.
5. A thorough study of existence, global stability and calculation of the stationary regimes in passive nonlinear systems is given in paper. The results are optimal as shown by examples.
6. A study of inverse scattering problems is given in a long series of papers (see monographs, and papers,) where a summary of some of the author's results is given. In a recent paper the problem which has been open for many decades is solved: uniqueness of the solution to a non-overdetermined inverse scattering problem is proved.
  Exact inversion of low-frequency scattering data is given in the book.
  A powerful method, Property C method, based on the notion of completeness of the set of products of solutions of PDE is developed and applied to many important inverse problems. In these works several problems are solved which have been open for decades. For example, the first global uniqueness theorems in geophysics and potential scattering with fixed-energy data are obtained, the first mathematically justified method for solving the 3D inverse scattering problem with noisy fixed-energy data is given, and, for the first time, stability estimates for the solution to the inverse scattering problem with noisy fixed-energy data are obtained.
  The first variational principle for solving inverse scattering problems which is equivalent to the inverse problems was found; this work is published as a monograph, which is an expanded version of monograph, translated into Russian in 1994. Very recently (paper) a fundamentally new uniqueness theorem is obtained: it says that a compactly supported real-valued square-integrable spherically symmetric potential is uniquely defined by any part of the fixed-energy phase shifts with the angular momenta $j$ running through an arbitrary set $J$ of non-negative integers such that $\sum_{j\in J,j\not=0}\frac{1}{j}=\infty$.
  Property C is defined and proved for ordinary differential equations (ODE) and its many new applications are demonstrated. Most of the known results for one-dimensional inverse problems are obtained by using this property, and many new results. Among the classical results which are obtained by using property C for ODE are Marchenko and Borg's uniqueness theorems concerning recovery of the potential from two spectra and from scattering data or spectral function.
  Inverse problems for an inhomogeneous Schrödinger equation are studied for the first time, a non-over-determined three-dimensional inverse problem of recovery of a potential from the diagonal values of the spectral function known on the boundary of a bounded domain and all real values of the spectral parameter is considered and a uniqueness theorem is proved for this problem.
  A new approximate method for solving the inverse scattering problem with fixed energy data is given for a spherically symmetric potentials which are known for r > a but unknown for $r < a$, where $a > 0$ is an arbitrary large fixed number. Numerical results are obtained by this method. Krein's method in inverse scattering is justified and its consistency is proved.
  Analytical theory is given for inversion of the surface scattering data in the ground-penetrating radar problem for two functions: permittivity and conductivity of the ground, under the assumption that these functions depend on the vertical coordinate only,.
  A method for recovery of a quarkonium system from experimental data is developed.
  Inverse problem of finding point scatterers from the surface scattering data is posed and solved.
  For the first time uniqueness theorems are proved for three-dimensional scattering problems with non-overdetermined data.
  Stability of the Pompeiu property is established and further results are obtained.
  In papers and a method for constructing a ”smart material” is given. It is proved that one can distribute small particles in a bounded domain so that the resulting material has the a priori chosen radiation pattern. Moreover, a method for calculating the density of these particles and their properties is developed.
  In paper theory of scalar wave scattering by one and many small bodies of an arbitrary shape is developed for various boundary conditions (Dirichlet, Neumann, impedance, transmission). In paper theory of EM (electromagnetic) wave scattering by one and many small impedance bodies of an arbitrary shape is developed. Methods for creating materials with a desired refraction coefficient are given on the basis of the above theory. In and in monographs, for the first time the 3D inverse scattering problem is studied for the non-overdetermined scattering data and the uniqueness of its solution is proved.
7. Mathematical justification of the T-matrix approach in scattering theory is given. In a series of papers several ill-posed problems are investigated. In particular, the now widely used stable differentiation procedure based on the regularization by the choice of the step size in the divided difference formula has been introduced originally in.
  The important feature of this and other of my works on ill-posed problems is the error estimates with explicitly written estimation constants.
  A theory for stable solution of a class of Fredholm equations at a characteristic value is constructed in several papers and presented systematically in the monograph. This theory was a basis for the theory of wave scattering by small bodies of arbitrary shapes in this monograph.
  Numerical methods were given for solving integral equations of estimation theory in distributions. This theory is summarized in the monograph. The basis of it is a theory, developed by the author, of a class of multidimensional integral equations whose kernels are kernels of positive rational functions of arbitrary selfadjoint elliptic operators.
  In a series of papers some of which are joint with Ramm's Ph.D. students, and in monograph a general method, the Dynamical Systems Method (DSM) for treating linear and, especially, nonlinear ill-posed problems by solving a suitable Cauchy problem in a Hilbert space was developed. Convergence theorems are proved. Discretization of the Cauchy problem leads to a variety of iterative methods for solving ill-posed nonlinear problems and convergence theorems for these methods are obtained. In monograph these results are illustrated by numerical examples.
  A novel approach to solving exterior and interior boundary value problems and scattering problems, based on the theorem, proved by Ramm and called Modified Rayleigh conjecture, has been developed and tested numerically (papers,).
8. The theory of weakly non-selfadjoint operators was applied to scattering theory. For the first time completeness of the set of root vectors of some non-selfadjoint integral operators arising in diffraction and scattering theory was proved. This gave a mathematical justification of the EEM (eigenmode expansion method), a popular method in electrical engineering.
9. Jointly with his Ph.D. student A. I. Katsevich, numerical methods for signal and image processing, edge detection in particular, are developed, and a very general test of randomness against fairly broad alternatives is found and justified mathematically.
  New methods were developed jointly with A. I. Katsevich for finding jumps of functions from local tomographic data. These methods turned to be practically important.
  These results were tested numerically and practically and demonstrated their effectiveness. A monograph contained these results was published in 1996 jointly with A. I. Katsevich.
  Two patents (5,539,800 of July 23, 1996 and 5,550,892 of Aug. 27, 1996) have been issued by the US Patent Office to A. G. Ramm and A. I. Katsevich ”Enhanced local tomography” and ”Pseudolocal tomography”.
10. A systematic study of the singularities of the Radon transform is given, a complete description of the asymptotics of the Radon transform near a point of its singular support is obtained and applied to the important problem of tomography: finding singularities of a function from its tomographic data; these results are published in a series of papers and appeared in the monograph.
11. The uniqueness theorems for model inverse problems of geophysics have been proved, examples of non-uniqueness were constructed, the theory of inversion of low-frequency data has been developed (monographs and).
12. Theoretical investigation of a number of antenna synthesis problems, including a non-linear synthesis problems have been investigated. Degree of non-uniqueness of the solution to the general synthesis problem has been described (monograph,). There are many other results of various nature and in different branches of mathematics: general relativity, asymptotic of the spectra of linear operators and quadratic forms, approximation theory, variational estimates of capacitances and polarizabilities, methods for calculation of resonances in open systems and quantum mechanics, perturbation theory for resonances, impedance tomography, singular perturbation of integral equations, quantum chaos, etc. The characteristic features of the works is a systematic usage of functional analysis and classical analysis, numerical methods, PDE, physics and theoretical engineering and their combinations. Broad interests made it possible to interact with mathematicians and engineers with quite diverse interests.
13. In 2007-2017 A.G.Ramm has published a series of papers (-,-,-, and in monographs and) in which he has developed a method for creating materials with a desired refraction coefficient. This method is based on Ramm's solution to many-body scattering problem by many small particles embedded in an inhomogeneous medium. The refraction coefficient can be created so that the new material has a desired wave-focusing property, or it may have a negative refraction property, which means that the group velocity in this material is directed opposite to the phase velocity. These results are presented in monographs and. Monograph is the second edition of. These results will be immediately applicable practically if small impedance particles with a desired refraction coefficient can be produced in practice.
14. In 2017-2019 A.G. Ramm was working on symmetry problems for PDE. His new results, including the proof of the Schiffer's conjecture and a solution to the Pompeiu problem are presented in the monograph and in papers.
15. In 2019-2021 A.G.Ramm worked on the Navier-Stokes problem (NSP). He published monograph R707 where a detailed analysis of the NSP is given. It is proved that the Navier-Stokes equations are contradictory. In paper the NSP paradox is formulated. These results solve the millennium Navier-Stokes problem in $\mathbb{R}^3$. As of August 24, 2022, this solution has not been accepted by the Clay Mathematics Institute, but nobody so far pointed any unclear points in the monograph. There is a review of the paper published in Zentralblatt, where an estimate in is claimed to be wrong. This claim in Zentralblatt review is erroneous as was proved in.
16. In 2017-2019 A.G.Ramm has proved for the first time uniqueness of the solution to the inverse scattering problem for compactly supported potentials and non-over-determined scattering data. These results are published in monograph and in the author's papers cited there, in particular, in,. His theory includes a proof of uniqueness of the solution to inverse obstacle scattering problem with non-over-determined data. These results are presented in papers, and in monographs.
17. In 2018–2022 A. G. Ramm has developed a theory for solving convolution integral equations with highly singular kernels.
18. In 2022 A.G. Ramm proved existence and uniqueness of the solution to the Dirichlet problem with $L^1(S)$ boundary data.
19. In, global existence and stability of solutions to nonlinear differential equations are presented.
20. In the size of a scatterer is estimated from its scattering amplitude.
