= Antieigenvalue theory =

Applied mathematical theory

In applied mathematics, antieigenvalue theory was developed by Karl Gustafson from 1966 to 1968. The theory is applicable to numerical analysis, wavelets, statistics, quantum mechanics, finance and optimization.

The antieigenvectors $x$ are the vectors most turned by a matrix or operator $A$, that is to say those for which the angle between the original vector and its transformed image is greatest. The corresponding antieigenvalue $\mu$ is the cosine of the maximal turning angle. The maximal turning angle is $\phi(A)$ and is called the angle of the operator. Just like the eigenvalues which may be ordered as a spectrum from smallest to largest, the theory of antieigenvalues orders the antieigenvalues of an operator A from the smallest to the largest turning angles.
