= Eigenoperator =

Type of linear operator

In mathematics, an eigenoperator, A, of a matrix H is a linear operator such that

$$[H,A] = \lambda A \,$$

where $\lambda$ is a corresponding scalar called an eigenvalue.
