= Skew-Hamiltonian matrix =

Special type of square matrix in linear algebra

== Skew-Hamiltonian Matrices in Linear Algebra ==
In linear algebra, a skew-Hamiltonian matrix is a specific type of matrix that corresponds to a skew-symmetric bilinear form on a symplectic vector space. Let $V$ be a vector space equipped with a symplectic form, denoted by Ω. A symplectic vector space must necessarily be of even dimension.

A linear map $A:\; V \mapsto V$ is defined as a skew-Hamiltonian operator with respect to the symplectic form Ω if the bilinear form defined by $(x, y) \mapsto \Omega(A(x), y)$ is skew-symmetric.

Given a basis $e_1, \ldots, e_{2n}$ in $V$ , the symplectic form Ω can be expressed as $\sum_{i} e_i \wedge e_{n+i}$ . In this context, a linear operator $A$ is skew-Hamiltonian with respect to Ω if and only if its corresponding matrix satisfies the condition $A^T J = J A$, where $J$ is the skew-symmetric matrix defined as:

$$J=
\begin{bmatrix}
0 & I_n \\
-I_n & 0 \\
\end{bmatrix}$$

With $I_n$ representing the $n \times n$ identity matrix.

Matrices that meet this criterion are classified as skew-Hamiltonian matrices. Notably, the square of any Hamiltonian matrix is skew-Hamiltonian. Conversely, any skew-Hamiltonian matrix can be expressed as the square of a Hamiltonian matrix.
