= Matrix sign function =

Generalization of signum function to matrices

In mathematics, the matrix sign function is a matrix function on square matrices analogous to the complex sign function.

It was introduced by J.D. Roberts in 1971 as a tool for model reduction and for solving Lyapunov and Algebraic Riccati equation in a technical report of Cambridge University, which was later published in a journal in 1980.

== Definition ==
The matrix sign function is a generalization of the complex signum function

$$\operatorname{csgn}(z)= \begin{cases}
1 & \text{if } \mathrm{Re}(z) > 0, \\
-1 & \text{if } \mathrm{Re}(z) < 0,
\end{cases}$$

to the matrix valued analogue $\operatorname{csgn}(A)$. Although the sign function is not analytic, the matrix function is well defined for all matrices that have no eigenvalue on the imaginary axis, see for example the Jordan-form-based definition (where the derivatives are all zero).

== Properties ==
Theorem: Let $A\in\C^{n\times n}$, then $\operatorname{csgn}(A)^2 = I$.

Theorem: Let $A\in\C^{n\times n}$, then $\operatorname{csgn}(A)$ is diagonalizable and has eigenvalues that are $\pm 1$.

Theorem: Let $A\in\C^{n\times n}$, then $(I+\operatorname{csgn}(A))/2$ is a projector onto the invariant subspace associated with the eigenvalues in the right-half plane, and analogously for $(I-\operatorname{csgn}(A))/2$ and the left-half plane.

Theorem: Let $A\in\C^{n\times n}$, and
$$A = P\begin{bmatrix}J_+ & 0 \\ 0 & J_-\end{bmatrix}P^{-1}$$
be a Jordan decomposition such that $J_+$ corresponds to eigenvalues with positive real part and $J_-$ to eigenvalue with negative real part. Then
$$\operatorname{csgn}(A) = P\begin{bmatrix}I_+ & 0 \\ 0 & -I_-\end{bmatrix}P^{-1}$$
, where $I_+$ and $I_-$ are identity matrices of sizes corresponding to $J_+$ and $J_-$, respectively.

== Computational methods ==
The function can be computed with generic methods for matrix functions, but there are also specialized methods.

=== Newton iteration ===
The Newton iteration can be derived by observing that $\operatorname{csgn}(x) = \sqrt{x^2}/x$, which in terms of matrices can be written as $\operatorname{csgn}(A) = A^{-1}\sqrt{A^2}$, where we use the matrix square root. If we apply the Babylonian method to compute the square root of the matrix $A^2$, that is, the iteration $X_{k+1} = \frac{1}{2} \left(X_k + A^{2} X_k^{-1}\right)$, and define the new iterate $Z_k = A^{-1}X_k$, we arrive at the iteration

$Z_{k+1} = \frac{1}{2}\left(Z_k + Z_k^{-1}\right)$,

where typically $Z_0=A$. Convergence is global, and locally it is quadratic.

The Newton iteration uses the explicit inverse of the iterates $Z_k$.

=== Newton–Schulz iteration ===
To avoid the need of an explicit inverse used in the Newton iteration, the inverse can be approximated with one step of the Newton iteration for the inverse, $Z_k^{-1}\approx Z_k\left(2I-Z_k^2\right)$, derived by Schulz(de) in 1933. Substituting this approximation into the previous method, the new method becomes

$Z_{k+1} = \frac{1}{2}Z_k\left(3I - Z_k^2\right)$.

Convergence is (still) quadratic, but only local (guaranteed for $\|I-A^2\|<1$).

== Applications ==
=== Solutions of Sylvester equations ===
Theorem: Let $A,B,C\in\R^{n\times n}$ and assume that $A$ and $B$ are stable, then the unique solution to the Sylvester equation, $AX +XB = C$, is given by $X$ such that

$$\begin{bmatrix}
-I &2X\\ 0 & I
\end{bmatrix}
=
\operatorname{csgn}
\left(
\begin{bmatrix}
A &-C\\ 0 & -B
\end{bmatrix}
\right).$$

Proof sketch: The result follows from the similarity transform

$$\begin{bmatrix}
A &-C\\ 0 & -B
\end{bmatrix}
=
\begin{bmatrix}
I & X \\ 0 & I
\end{bmatrix}
\begin{bmatrix}
A & 0\\ 0 & -B
\end{bmatrix}
\begin{bmatrix}
I & X \\ 0 & I
\end{bmatrix}^{-1},$$

since

$$\operatorname{csgn}
\left(
\begin{bmatrix}
A &-C\\ 0 & -B
\end{bmatrix}
\right)
=
\begin{bmatrix}
I & X \\ 0 & I
\end{bmatrix}
\begin{bmatrix}
I & 0\\ 0 & -I
\end{bmatrix}
\begin{bmatrix}
I & -X \\ 0 & I
\end{bmatrix},$$

due to the stability of $A$ and $B$.

The theorem is, naturally, also applicable to the Lyapunov equation. However, due to the structure the Newton iteration simplifies to only involving inverses of $A$ and $A^T$.

=== Solutions of algebraic Riccati equations ===
There is a similar result applicable to the algebraic Riccati equation, $A^H P + P A - P F P + Q = 0$. Define $V,W\in\Complex^{2n\times n}$ as

$$\begin{bmatrix}
V & W
\end{bmatrix}
=
\operatorname{csgn}
\left(
\begin{bmatrix}
A^H &Q\\ F & -A
\end{bmatrix}
\right)
-
\begin{bmatrix}
I &0\\ 0 & I
\end{bmatrix}.$$

Under the assumption that $F,Q\in\Complex^{n\times n}$ are Hermitian and there exists a unique stabilizing solution, in the sense that $A-FP$ is stable, that solution is given by the over-determined, but consistent, linear system

$VP=-W.$

Proof sketch: The similarity transform

$$\begin{bmatrix}
A^H &Q\\ F & -A
\end{bmatrix}
=
\begin{bmatrix}
P & -I \\ I & 0
\end{bmatrix}
\begin{bmatrix}
-(A-FP) & -F\\ 0 & (A-FP)
\end{bmatrix}
\begin{bmatrix}
P & -I \\ I & 0
\end{bmatrix}^{-1},$$

and the stability of $A-FP$ implies that

$$\left(
\operatorname{csgn}
\left(
\begin{bmatrix}
A^H &Q\\ F & -A
\end{bmatrix}
\right)
-
\begin{bmatrix}
I &0\\ 0 & I
\end{bmatrix}
\right)
\begin{bmatrix}
X & -I \\ I & 0
\end{bmatrix}
=
\begin{bmatrix}
X & -I\\ I & 0
\end{bmatrix}
\begin{bmatrix}
0 & Y \\ 0 & -2I
\end{bmatrix},$$

for some matrix $Y\in\Complex^{n\times n}$.

=== Computations of matrix square-root ===
The Denman–Beavers iteration for the square root of a matrix can be derived from the Newton iteration for the matrix sign function by noticing that $A - PIP=0$ is a degenerate algebraic Riccati equation and by definition a solution $P$ is the square root of $A$.
