= LQR =

LQR may refer to:

- Law Quarterly Review, peer-reviewed academic journal covering common law
- Linear–quadratic regulator, a theory of optimal control
- Link Quality Report, a protocol that allows two computers to connect to each other
