= Kevin J. Zahnle =

Kevin J. Zahnle (born 1955) is a planetary scientist at the NASA Ames Research Center and a Fellow of the American Geophysical Union. He studies impact processes, atmospheric escape processes, geochemical modelling of atmophiles, and photochemical modelling. He also contributed to understanding the size-frequency distributions of minor planets and comets.

He earned his PhD in 1985 at the University of Michigan under Prof. James C. G. Walker. He then completed postdoctoral fellowships at both Stanford and NRC at NASA Ames before coming to NASA Ames Research Center in 1988.

Asteroid 7860 Zahnle, discovered by Edward Bowell at Anderson Mesa Station in 1980, was named in his honor. The official naming citation was published by the Minor Planet Center on 28 July 1999 (M.P.C. 35487).
