= Everett Shock =

American geochemist

- Born: Everett L. Shock
- Education: University of California, Santa Cruz (BS); University of California, Berkeley (PhD)
- Awards: Fellow, American Geophysical Union (2005); Fellow, Geochemical Society and European Association of Geochemisty (2009)
- Scientific career
- Fields: Geochemistry
- Institutions: Washington University in St. Louis; Arizona State University
- Thesis: Standard molal properties of ionic species and inorganic acids, dissolved gases and organic molecules in hydrothermal systems (1987)
- Doctoral advisor: Harold C. Helgeson
- Doctoral students: Christopher R. Glein

Everett L. Shock is an American geochemist and former experimental rock singer and songwriter. He is currently a professor with joint appointments in the School of Earth and Space Exploration and School of Molecular Sciences at Arizona State University. Shock and his research group work within a framework of chemical thermodynamics applied to field, experimental, and theoretical geochemical investigations to understand how geochemical processes provide energy to support microbial life on Earth and potentially on other ocean worlds.

== Early life and music ==
Shock grew up in Garden Grove, California and studied earth sciences at UC Santa Cruz, graduating in 1978. In the San Francisco Bay Area, he and high school friends Erling Wold, Lynn Murdock, and Brian Woodbury formed a music theater group called Splendrix, performing in a San Francisco theater they rented. After hearing the group promoting their show on UC Berkeley campus radio, musician and composer Henry Kaiser contacted them, planting the seeds for future collaboration. Later, with Woodbury having left the Bay Area, Shock, Wold, and Murdock along with high school classmates Bob Adams, Mark Crawford, and Rick Crawford began recording and performing experimental/avant-garde rock music with Kaiser, calling themselves Name. The group self-released an EP in 1981 and a LP in 1985 and performed at venues in the Bay Area with acts such as Negativland. In 1987, Shock earned his PhD in geology at Berkeley and Kaiser approached Shock about recording previously unrecorded material from the previous years before Shock left the Bay Area. The album Ghost Boys was released by SST Records in 1988 under Shock's name but with most members of Name also credited. The album features Wold's use of a synclavier as well as a version of the song "Stay a Little Longer". Shock is also credited on the SST album Crazy Backwards Alphabet.

== Scientific career ==
At Berkeley, Shock worked with Hal Helgeson on the estimation of thermodynamic properties for aqueous ionic species and aqueous organic species up to high temperatures and pressures. Shock was a professor in the Department of Earth and Planetary Sciences at Washington University in St. Louis from 1987 to 2002 before moving to Arizona State University. Shock's research group maintains an extensive thermodynamic database for aqueous solutes that enables geochemical modeling of aqueous solutions at hydrothermal conditions and of water-rock reactions. Continuing with a focus on the high-temperature aqueous chemistry of organic compounds, Shock leads an interdisciplinary group conducting experiments on the reactivity of organic compounds at hydrothermal conditions found in Earth's subsurface. The group recently patented a process for the synthesis of isooctane, a fuel component, in high-temperature water in the presence of the Earth-abundant metals nickel and iron.

Areas of focus for fieldwork include hydrothermal systems in Yellowstone National Park and serpentinizing systems of the Samail Ophiolite in Oman. Shock and collaborators cataloged chemical energy supplies available to thermophilic microbes in geochemically diverse hot springs in Yellowstone. Shock collaborated on a project that demonstrated that substrate use in culture of a strain of Acidianus is not controlled by energy supply but rather by demand and the cost of catalyzing specific reactions. His research group has also examined how the geochemical composition of hot spring fluids affects microbial community composition, such as the oxidation state of microbial lipids and the distribution of microbial phototrophs. The archaeon Thermogladius shockii was named in honor of Shock's work in Yellowstone. In Oman, the team determined the energy requirements for the oxidation of molecular hydrogen by methanogens may be higher in hyperalkaline fluids compared to freshwater or marine sediments, and this may contribute to competition with sulfate reducers. Work in Oman also led to the idea that changes in the rate of weathering of ultramafic rocks such as those found at the ophiolite may have contributed to enabling the Great Oxidation Event.

Submarine hydrothermal vents are another environment where chemical energy supports unique ecosystems. Shock and collaborator Jeffrey Dick used thermodynamic calculations based on the genome of Methanocaldococcus jannaschii to reveal that protein biosynthesis is an exergonic (energy-releasing) process in ultramafic submarine hydrothermal vents where the vent fluids mix with oxygenated seawater. Shock and postdoctoral researcher Vincent Milesi also developed an approach to geochemical modeling in support of ROV exploration of hydrothermal systems at Gorda Ridge off the coast of California aboard the EV Nautilus where data returned from the ROV is used to constrain models developed in advance nearly in real time, allowing for informed decision making about next steps. The researchers even tested how the approach can handle a built-in time delay between measurements by the ROV and receipt of the data to simulate exploration in space, in preparation for implementation of the method on the Europa Clipper mission to Jupiter. Shock is a co-investigator on the MASPEX team designing the mass spectrometer that will fly on Europa Clipper to provide compositional data at Europa.
