= Analytic function of a matrix =

Function that maps matrices to matrices

In mathematics, every analytic function can be used for defining a matrix function that maps square matrices with complex entries to square matrices of the same size.

This is used for defining the exponential of a matrix, which is involved in the closed-form solution of systems of linear differential equations.

== Extending scalar function to matrix functions ==
There are several techniques for lifting a real function to a square matrix function such that interesting properties are maintained. All of the following techniques yield the same matrix function, but the domains on which the function is defined may differ.

=== Power series ===
If the analytic function f has the Taylor expansion
$$f(x) = c_0 + c_1 x + c_2 x^2 + \cdots$$
then a matrix function $A\mapsto f(A)$ can be defined by substituting $x$ by a square matrix: powers become matrix powers, additions become matrix sums and multiplications by coefficients become scalar multiplications. The $c_0$ term becomes $c_0 I$, where $I$ is the identity matrix. If the series converges for $|x| < r$, then the corresponding matrix series converges for matrices A such that $\|A\| < r$ for some matrix norm that satisfies $\|AB\|\leq \|A\|\|B\|$.

=== Diagonalizable matrices ===
A square matrix A is diagonalizable, if there is an invertible matrix P such that $D = P^{-1}\,A\,P$ is a diagonal matrix, that is, D has the shape
$$D=\begin{bmatrix}
d_1 & \cdots & 0 \\
\vdots & \ddots & \vdots \\
0      & \cdots & d_n
\end{bmatrix}.$$

As $A = P\,D\,P^{-1},$ it follows from the series definition that
$$f(A)=P\, \begin{bmatrix}
f(d_1) & \cdots & 0 \\
\vdots & \ddots & \vdots \\
0      & \cdots & f(d_n)
\end{bmatrix}\,P^{-1}.$$

It can be verified that the matrix f(A) does not depend on a particular choice of P.

For example, suppose one is seeking $\Gamma(A) = (A-1)!$ for
$$A = \begin{bmatrix}
1&3\\
2&1
\end{bmatrix} .$$

One has
$$A = P \begin{bmatrix}
1-\sqrt{6}& 0 \\
0 & 1+ \sqrt{6}
\end{bmatrix} P^{-1}~,$$
for
$$P= \begin{bmatrix}
1/2 & 1/2 \\
-\frac{1}{\sqrt{6}} &\frac{1}{\sqrt{6}}
\end{bmatrix} ~.$$

Application of the formula then simply yields
$$\Gamma(A) = \begin{bmatrix}
1/2 & 1/2 \\
-\frac{1}{\sqrt{6} } & \frac{1}{\sqrt{6} }
\end{bmatrix} \cdot
\begin{bmatrix}
\Gamma(1-\sqrt{6}) & 0\\
0&\Gamma(1+\sqrt{6})
\end{bmatrix} \cdot
\begin{bmatrix}
1 & -\sqrt{6}/2 \\
1 & \sqrt{6}/2
\end{bmatrix} \approx
\begin{bmatrix} 2.8114 & 0.4080 \\
0.2720 & 2.8114
\end{bmatrix} ~.$$

Likewise,
$$A^4 = \begin{bmatrix}
1/2 & 1/2 \\
-\frac{1}{\sqrt{6} } & \frac{1}{\sqrt{6} }
\end{bmatrix} \cdot
\begin{bmatrix}
(1-\sqrt{6})^4 & 0\\
0&(1+\sqrt{6})^4
\end{bmatrix} \cdot
\begin{bmatrix}
1 & -\sqrt{6}/2 \\
1 & \sqrt{6}/2
\end{bmatrix} =
\begin{bmatrix} 73 & 84\\
56 & 73
\end{bmatrix} ~.$$

=== Jordan decomposition ===
All complex matrices, whether they are diagonalizable or not, have a Jordan normal form $A = P\,J\,P^{-1}$, where the matrix J consists of Jordan blocks. The method is presented in detail in section 1.2.2, pages 4-7, of the book by Higham using the Hermite interpolation with the use of confluent Vandermonde matrix. Consider these blocks separately and apply the power series to a Jordan block:
$$f \left( \begin{bmatrix}
\lambda & 1       & 0      & \cdots & 0 \\
0       & \lambda & 1      & \vdots & \vdots \\
0       & 0       & \ddots & \ddots & \vdots \\
\vdots  & \cdots  & \ddots & \lambda & 1 \\
0       & \cdots  & \cdots & 0 & \lambda
\end{bmatrix} \right) =
\begin{bmatrix}
\frac{f(\lambda)}{0!} & \frac{f'(\lambda)}{1!} & \frac{f''(\lambda)}{2!} & \cdots                & \frac{f^{(n-1)}(\lambda)}{(n-1)!} \\
0                     & \frac{f(\lambda)}{0!}  & \frac{f'(\lambda)}{1!}  & \vdots                & \frac{f^{(n-2)}(\lambda)}{(n-2)!} \\
0                     & 0                      & \ddots                  & \ddots                & \vdots \\
\vdots                & \cdots                 & \ddots                  & \frac{f(\lambda)}{0!} & \frac{f'(\lambda)}{1!} \\
0                     & \cdots                 & \cdots                  & 0                     & \frac{f(\lambda)}{0!}
\end{bmatrix}.$$

This definition can be used to extend the domain of the matrix function beyond the set of matrices with spectral radius smaller than the radius of convergence of the power series. Note that there is also a connection to divided differences.

A related notion is the Jordan–Chevalley decomposition which expresses a matrix as a sum of a diagonalizable and a nilpotent part.

==== Hermitian matrices ====
A Hermitian matrix has all real eigenvalues and can always be diagonalized by a unitary matrix P, according to the spectral theorem. In this case, the Jordan definition is natural. Moreover, this definition allows one to extend standard inequalities for real functions:

If $f(a) \leq g(a)$ for all eigenvalues of $A$, then $f(A) \preceq g(A)$. (As a convention, $X \preceq Y \Leftrightarrow Y - X$ is a positive-semidefinite matrix.) The proof follows directly from the definition.

=== Cauchy integral ===
Cauchy's integral formula from complex analysis can also be used to generalize scalar functions to matrix functions. Cauchy's integral formula states that for any analytic function f defined on a set D ⊂ C, one has
$$f(x) = \frac{1}{2\pi i} \oint_{C}\! {\frac{f(z)}{z-x}}\, \mathrm{d}z ~,$$
where C is a closed simple curve inside the domain D enclosing x.

Now, replace x by a matrix A and consider a path C inside D that encloses all eigenvalues of A. One possibility to achieve this is to let C be a circle around the origin with radius larger than ‖A‖ for an arbitrary matrix norm ‖·‖. Then, f (A) is definable by
$$f(A) = \frac{1}{2\pi i} \oint_C f(z)\left(z I - A\right)^{-1} \mathrm{d}z \,.$$

This integral can readily be evaluated numerically using the trapezium rule, which converges exponentially in this case. That means that the precision of the result doubles when the number of nodes is doubled. In routine cases, this is bypassed by Sylvester's formula.

This idea applied to bounded linear operators on a Banach space, which can be seen as infinite matrices, leads to the holomorphic functional calculus.

=== Matrix perturbations ===
The above Taylor power series allows the scalar $x$ to be replaced by the matrix. This is not true in general when expanding in terms of $A(\eta) = A+\eta B$ about $\eta = 0$ unless $[A,B]=0$. A counterexample is $f(x) = x^{3}$, which has a finite length Taylor series. We compute this in two ways,

- Distributive law:
  $$f(A + \eta B) = (A+\eta B)^{3} = A^{3} + \eta(A^{2}B + ABA + BA^{2}) + \eta^{2}(AB^{2} + BAB + B^{2}A) + \eta^{3}B^{3}$$
- Using scalar Taylor expansion for $f(a+\eta b)$ and replacing scalars with matrices at the end:
  $$\begin{align}
f(a+\eta b) &= f(a) + f'(a)\frac{\eta b}{1!} + f''(a)\frac{(\eta b)^2}{2!} + f'''(a)\frac{(\eta b)^3}{3!} \\[.5em]
&= a^3 + 3a^2(\eta b) + 3a(\eta b)^2 + (\eta b)^3 \\[.5em]
&\to A^3 = + 3A^2(\eta B) + 3A(\eta B)^2 + (\eta B)^3
\end{align}$$

The scalar expression assumes commutativity while the matrix expression does not, and thus they cannot be equated directly unless $[A,B]=0$. For some f(x) this can be dealt with using the same method as scalar Taylor series. For example, $f(x) = \frac{1}{x}$. If $A^{-1}$ exists then $f(A+\eta B) = f(\mathbb{I} + \eta A^{-1}B)f(A)$. The expansion of the first term then follows the power series given above,

$$f(\mathbb{I} + \eta A^{-1}B) = \mathbb{I} - \eta A^{-1}B + (-\eta A^{-1}B)^2 + \cdots = \sum_{n=0}^\infty (-\eta A^{-1}B)^n$$

The convergence criteria of the power series then apply, requiring $\Vert \eta A^{-1}B \Vert$ to be sufficiently small under the appropriate matrix norm. For more general problems, which cannot be rewritten in such a way that the two matrices commute, the ordering of matrix products produced by repeated application of the Leibniz rule must be tracked.

=== Arbitrary function of a 2×2 matrix ===
An arbitrary function f(A) of a 2×2 matrix A has its Sylvester's formula simplify to
$$f(A) = \frac{f(\lambda_+) + f(\lambda_-)}{2} I + \frac{A - \left (\frac{tr(A)}{2}\right )I}{\sqrt{\left (\frac{tr(A)}{2}\right)^2 - |A|}} \frac{f(\lambda_+) - f(\lambda_-)}{2} ~,$$
where $\lambda_\pm$ are the eigenvalues of its characteristic equation, |A − λI| = 0, and are given by
$$\lambda_\pm = \frac{tr(A)}{2} \pm \sqrt{\left (\frac{tr(A)}{2}\right )^2 - |A|} .$$
However, if there is degeneracy, the following formula is used, where f' is the derivative of f.
$$f(A) = f \left( \frac{tr(A)}{2} \right) I + \mathrm{adj} \left( \frac{tr(A)}{2}I - A \right ) f' \left( \frac{tr(A)}{2} \right) .$$

=== Examples ===
- Matrix polynomial
- Matrix root
- Matrix logarithm
- Matrix exponential
- Matrix sign function

== Classes of matrix functions ==
Using the semidefinite ordering ($X \preceq Y \Leftrightarrow Y - X$ is positive-semidefinite and $X \prec Y \Leftrightarrow Y - X$ is positive definite), some of the classes of scalar functions can be extended to matrix functions of Hermitian matrices.

=== Operator monotone ===
A function f is called operator monotone if and only if $0 \prec A \preceq H \Rightarrow f(A) \preceq f(H)$ for all self-adjoint matrices A,H with spectra in the domain of f. This is analogous to monotone function in the scalar case.

=== Operator concave/convex ===
A function f is called operator concave if and only if
$$\tau f(A) + (1-\tau) f(H) \preceq f \left ( \tau A + (1-\tau)H \right )$$
for all self-adjoint matrices A,H with spectra in the domain of f and $\tau \in [0,1]$. This definition is analogous to a concave scalar function. An operator convex function can be defined be switching $\preceq$ to $\succeq$ in the definition above.

=== Examples ===
The matrix log is both operator monotone and operator concave. The matrix square is operator convex. The matrix exponential is none of these. Loewner's theorem states that a function on an open interval is operator monotone if and only if it has an analytic extension to the upper and lower complex half planes so that the upper half plane is mapped to itself.

== See also ==
- Algebraic Riccati equation
- Sylvester's formula
- Loewner order
- Matrix calculus
- Trace inequalities
- Trigonometric functions of matrices
