= Reactive transport modeling in porous media =

Reactive transport modeling in porous media refers to the creation of computer models integrating chemical reaction with transport of fluids through the Earth's crust. Such models predict the distribution in space and time of the chemical reactions that occur along a flowpath. Reactive transport modeling in general can refer to many other processes, including reactive flow of chemicals through tanks, reactors, or membranes; particles and species in the atmosphere; gases exiting a smokestack; and migrating magma.

== Overview ==
Reactive transport models are constructed to understand the composition of natural waters; the origin of economic mineral deposits; the formation and dissolution of rocks and minerals in geologic formations in response to injection of industrial wastes, steam, or carbon dioxide; and the generation of acidic waters and leaching of metals from mine wastes. They are often relied upon to predict the migration of contaminant plumes; the mobility of radionuclides in waste repositories; and the biodegradation of chemicals in landfills. When applied to the study of contaminants in the environments, they are known as fate and transport models.

== Development of reactive transport modeling ==
Modern reactive transport modeling has arisen from several separate schools of thought. Hydrologists primarily concerned with the physical nature of mass transport assumed relatively simple reaction formulations, such as linear distribution coefficients or linear decay terms, which could be added to the advection-dispersion equation. By assuming linear, equilibrium sorption, for example, the advection-dispersion equation can be modified by a simple retardation factor and solved analytically. Such analytical solutions are limited to relatively simple flow systems and reactions.

Geochemical models, on the other hand, have been developed to provide thermodynamic descriptions of multicomponent systems without regard to transport. Reaction path models were created, for instance, to describe the sequence of chemical reactions resulting from chemical weathering or hydrothermal alteration in batch systems, in terms of the overall reaction progress. By adopting the reference frame of a packet of fluid and treating reaction progress as travel time (or distance along a flowpath), however, a batch reaction path model could be thought of as describing advective transport through an aquifer.

The most sophisticated multi-component reactive transport models consider both reaction and transport. Early studies developed the theoretical basis of reactive transport models, and the numerical tools necessary to solve them, and applied them to problems of reactive contaminant transport and flow through reacting hydrothermal systems.

Reactive transport models have found increased application in recent years with improvements in the power of personal computers and modeling software.

== Processes considered in reactive transport models ==
Reactive transport models couple a large number chemical reactions with mass transport. Certain applications, such as geothermal energy production and ore deposit modeling, require the additional calculation of heat transfer. In modeling carbon sequestration and hydraulic fracturing, moreover, it may be necessary to describe rock deformation resulting from mineral growth or abnormally high fluid pressure. Description of transport through the unsaturated zone and multiphase flow modeling, as applied to transport of petroleum and natural gas; non-aqueous phase liquids (DNAPL or LNAPL); and supercritical carbon dioxide requires increasingly complex models which are prone to considerable uncertainty.

In many cases the processes simulated in reactive transport models are highly related. Mineral dissolution and precipitation, for example, can affect the porosity and permeability of the domain, which in turn affect the flow field and groundwater velocity. Heat transport greatly affects the viscosity of water and its ability to flow. Below are many of the physical and chemical processes which can be simulated with reactive transport models.

Geochemical reactions:

- Acid-base reactions
- Aqueous complexation
- Mineral dissolution and precipitation
- Reduction and oxidation (redox) reactions, including those catalyzed by enzymes, surfaces, and microorganisms
- Sorption, ion exchange, and surface complexation
- Gas dissolution and exsolution
- Stable isotope fractionation
- Radioactive decay

Mass Transport:

- Advection
- Molecular scale diffusion
- Hydrodynamic dispersion
- Colloid-facilitated transport

Heat transport:

- Advection
- Conduction
- Convection

Medium deformation:

- Compression or expansion of the domain
- Fracture formation

== Solving reactive transport models ==
Some of the simplest reactive transport problems can be solved analytically. Where equilibrium sorption is described by a linear distribution coefficient, for example, the sorbing solute's velocity is retarded relative to that of a nonreactive tracer; the relative velocities can be described with a retardation factor. Analytical solutions are exact solutions of the governing equations.

Complex reactive transport problems are more commonly solved numerically. In this case, the governing equations are approximated so that they can be solved by computer algorithms. The governing equations, including both reaction and transport terms, can be solved simultaneously using a one-step or global implicit simulator. This technique is straightforward conceptually, but computationally very difficult.

Instead of solving all the relevant equations together, the transport and chemical reaction equations can be solved separately. Operator splitting, as this technique is known, uses appropriate numerical techniques to solve the reaction and transport equations at each time step. Various methods exist, including the sequential non-iterative approach (SNIA), Strang splitting, and sequential iterative approach (SIA). Since the reaction and transport terms are handled separately, separate programs for batch reaction and transport can be linked together. Cross-linkable re-entrant software objects designed for this purpose readily enable construction of reactive transport models of any flow configuration.

== Challenges ==
Reactive transport modeling requires input from numerous fields, including hydrology, geochemistry and biogeochemistry, microbiology, soil physics, and fluid dynamics. The numerical formulation and solution of reactive transport problems can be especially difficult due to errors arising in the coupling process, beyond those inherent to the individual processes. Valocchi and Malmstead (1992), for example, reported on the potential errors arising from the operator splitting technique.

Even in the absence of numerical difficulties, the general lack of knowledge available to practitioners creates uncertainty. Field sites are typically heterogeneous, both physically and chemically, and sampling is often sparse. The prevailing assumption of Fickian dispersion is often inadequate. Equilibrium constants and kinetic rate laws for relevant reactions are often poorly known. The complexity of many processes requires expertise in one or more of the aforementioned fields. Many processes, such as long-term nuclear waste storage, cannot be experimentally verified; reactive transport problems can only attempt to predict such long-term behavior. The current descriptions of multi-phase flow and mechanical deformation processes are still being developed.

== Software programs in common use ==
- PFLOTRAN*
- ChemPlugin
- MIN3P
- CHESS, HYTEC
- CrunchFlow
- The Geochemist's Workbench
- HYDROGEOCHEM
- THMC
- PHREEQC,
- PHAST
- Reaktoro
- TOUGHREACT
- OpenGeoSys
- PHT3D
- PNBRNS
- HP1 / HP2

== See also ==
- Chemical thermodynamics
- Chemical kinetics
- Geochemistry
- Geomicrobiology
- Hydrogeology
- Groundwater model
- Geochemical modeling
- Reservoir simulation
- Chemical process modeling
- Chemical transport model
