= GRADELA =

GRADELA is a simple gradient elasticity model involving one internal length in addition to the two Lamé parameters. It allows eliminating elastic singularities and discontinuities and to interpret elastic size effects. This model has been suggested by Elias C. Aifantis. The main advantage of GRADELA over Mindlin's elasticity models (which contains five extra constants) is the fact that solutions of boundary value problems can be found in terms of corresponding solutions of classical elasticity by operator splitting method.

In 1992-1993 it has been suggested by Elias C. Aifantis a generalization of the linear elastic constitutive relations by the gradient modification that contains the Laplacian in the form $\sigma_{ij} = \Bigl( \lambda \varepsilon_{kk} \delta_{ij} + 2 \mu \varepsilon_{ij} \Bigr) - l^2_s \, \Delta \, \Bigl( \lambda \varepsilon_{kk} \delta_{ij} + 2 \mu \varepsilon_{ij} \Bigr) ,$ where $l_s$ is the scale parameter.

== See also ==
- Linear elasticity
- Mindlin–Reissner plate theory
