= Crazy Backwards Alphabet =

Studio album by Henry Kaiser and Crazy Backwards Alphabet
- Released: January 1987
- Recorded: December 1986
- Genre: Folk rock; progressive rock; alternative rock; avant-garde; musique concrète
- Length: 46:23 (LP version), 1:12:46 (CD version)
- Label: SST (110)
- Producer: Henry Kaiser

Henry Kaiser chronology
Tomorrow Knows Where You Live (1986)	Crazy Backwards Alphabet (1987)	With Enemies Like These, Who Needs Friends? (1987)

Matt Groening chronology
Crazy Backwards Alphabet (1987)	The Simpsons Sing the Blues (1990)

SST Records chronology
Universal Congress Of (SST 109) (1987)	Crazy Backwards Alphabet (SST 110) (1987)	Mystery Spot (SST 111) (1987)

Professional ratings
Review scores
Source	Rating
Allmusic	3.5/5 stars

Crazy Backwards Alphabet is an album conceived by cartoonist Matt Groening and recorded by Henry Kaiser. The core group features Kaiser on guitar along with drummer John "Drumbo" French (ex Captain Beefheart and the Magic Band), bassist Andy West (of Dixie Dregs), and Swedish avant-rock drummer Michael Maksymenko.

American rock critic Robert Christgau said of the album: "Concept is Beefheart as Dixie Dregs, kind of, with intermittent lyrics, not always in English." It was released in 1987.

Further recordings were made for a follow-up album; however, it was not released until 2007 as Crazy Backwards Alphabet II.

== Track listing ==
=== LP version ===
==== Side one ====
1. "The Blood and the Ink" (Bob Adams & John French) – 5:02
2. "Det Enda Raka?" (Michael Maksymenko) – 1:58
3. "Get To You" (John French) – 4:30
4. "The Welfare Elite" (John French & Henry Kaiser) – 3:52
5. "Ghosts" (Albert Ayler) – 4:18
6. "Lobster on the Rocks #2" (John French, Henry Kaiser, Michael Maksymenko, Andy West & Stuart Wold) – 3:15

==== Side two ====
1. "Sarayushka (La Grange)" (Original Composition: Billy Gibbons, Dusty Hill & Frank Beard•Russian Translation: Michael Maksymenko) – 2:26
2. "Dropped D" (Bob Adams, Henry Kaiser, Michael Maksymenko & Andy West) – 7:53
3. "The Book of Joel" (Bob Adams, Everett Shock) – 2:04
4. "Bottoms Up!" (Michael Maksymenko) – 3:40
5. "We Are In Control?" (John French) – 5:25
6. "Maran II" (Michael Maksymenko) – 0:24

=== CD version ===
1. "The Blood and the Ink" (Bob Adams & John French) – 5:02
2. "Det Enda Raka?" (Michael Maksymenko) – 1:58
3. "Get To You" (John French) – 4:30
4. "The Welfare Elite" (John French & Henry Kaiser) – 3:52
5. "Ghosts" (Albert Ayler) – 4:18
6. "Lobster on the Rocks" (John French, Henry Kaiser, Michael Maksymenko, Andy West & Stuart Wold) – 3:15
7. "Sarayushka (La Grange)" (Billy Gibbons, Dusty Hill & Frank Beard•Russian Translation: Michael Maksymenko) – 2:26
8. "Dropped D" (Bob Adams, Henry Kaiser, Michael Maksymenko & Andy West) – 7:53
9. "The Book of Joel" (Bob Adams, Everett Shock) – 2:04
10. "Bottoms Up!" (Michael Maksymenko) – 3:40
11. "We Are In Control?" (John French) – 5:25
12. "Maran II" (Michael Maksymenko) – 0:24
13. "No Doubt About It, I Gotta Get a New Hat" (Henry Kaiser) – 4:32*
14. "Secret of the Telegian" (Greg Goodman, Henry Kaiser & Michael Maksymenko) – 6:17*
15. ""Lite" Blue Mousse" (Bob Adams, Henry Kaiser, Michael Maksymenko & Ralf Nygard) – 7:11*
16. "The Same Thing" (Willie Dixon) – 5:59*
17. "Herr Magazine" (Bob Adams, Everett Shock, Henry Kaiser & Michael Maksymenko) – 3:04*

*bonus tracks on CD only

== Personnel ==
=== Crazy Backwards Alphabet are ===
- Henry Kaiser – guitar (tracks 1–10, 12), slide guitar (tracks 1, 5, 10, 11), banjo (tracks 4, 12), backing vocals (tracks 6, 9)
- John French – drums (tracks 1, 3, 4, 7, 11, 12), lead vocals (tracks 1, 3), guitar (track 3), harmonica (track 3), keyboards (track 11)
- Michael Maksymenko – drums (tracks 2, 5, 6, 8–10), lead vocals (tracks 2, 6, 7, 10), backing vocals (track 9)
- Andy West – bass (tracks 2–12)

=== Special guests ===
Bob Adams – guitar (track 1), bass (track 1)
Scott Colby – slide guitar (track 3), lead vocals (track 9)
Darol Anger – violin (track 4)
Harry Duncan – harp (track 10)
Bill Frisell – guitar
Ralph Nygard – midi wind controller bass

== Production crew ==
Henry Kaiser – producer/engineer
Phil Brown – engineer
Oliver DiCiccco – engineer
Mark Bryan Johnson – engineer
Matt Groening – artwork and album concept
Hugh Brown – photography
Recorded in 1986, except 13 & 14 in 1987 and 15 in 1991.
