= Loewner order =

Partial order on matrices

In mathematics, Loewner order is the partial order defined by the convex cone of positive semi-definite matrices. This order is usually employed to generalize the definitions of monotone and concave/convex scalar functions to monotone and concave/convex Hermitian valued functions. These functions arise naturally in matrix and operator theory and have applications in many areas of physics and engineering.

== Definition ==
Let A and B be two Hermitian matrices of order n. We say that A ≥ B if A − B is positive semi-definite. Similarly, we say that A > B if A − B is positive definite.

Although it is commonly discussed on matrices (as a finite-dimensional case), the Loewner order is also well-defined on operators (an infinite-dimensional case) in the analogous way.

== Properties ==
When A and B are real scalars (i.e. n = 1), the Loewner order reduces to the usual ordering of R. Although some familiar properties of the usual order of R are also valid when n ≥ 2, several properties are no longer valid. For instance, the comparability of two matrices may no longer be valid. In fact, if
$$A =
\begin{bmatrix}
1 & 0 \\
0 & 0
\end{bmatrix}\$$
and
$$B =
\begin{bmatrix}
0 & 0 \\
0 & 1
\end{bmatrix}\$$
then neither A ≥ B or B ≥ A holds true. In other words, the Loewner order is a partial order, but not a total order.

Moreover, since A and B are Hermitian matrices, their eigenvalues are all real numbers. If λ_{1}(B) is the maximum eigenvalue of B and λ_{n}(A) the minimum eigenvalue of A, a sufficient criterion to have A ≥ B is that λ_{n}(A) ≥ λ_{1}(B). If A or B is a multiple of the identity matrix, then this criterion is also necessary.

The Loewner order does not have the least-upper-bound property, and therefore does not form a lattice. It is bounded: for any finite set $S$ of matrices, one can find an "upper-bound" matrix A that is greater than all of S. However, there will be multiple upper bounds. In a lattice, there would exist a unique maximum $\max(S)$ such that any upper bound U on $S$ obeys $\max(S)$ ≤ U. But in the Loewner order, one can have two upper bounds A and B that are both minimal (there is no element C < A that is also an upper bound) but that are incomparable (A - B is neither positive semidefinite nor negative semidefinite).

== See also ==
- Trace inequalities
