= Aqion =

- Release: January 1, 2012
- Stable release: version 10.0 / Oct 2026
- Written in: C++
- Operating system: Windows
- Size: 15 MB
- Available in: English, German
- Website: aqion.de

Aqion is a hydrochemistry software tool. It bridges the gap between scientific software (such like PhreeqC) and the calculation/handling of "simple" water-related tasks in daily routine practice. The software aqion is free for private users, education and companies.

== Motivation & history ==
First. Most of the hydrochemical software is designed for experts and scientists. In order to flatten the steep learning curve aqion provides an introduction to fundamental water-related topics in form of a "chemical pocket calculator".

Second. The program mediates between two terminological concepts: The calculations are performed in the "scientific realm" of thermodynamics (activities, speciation, log K values, ionic strength, etc.). Then, the output is translated into the "language" of common use: molar and mass concentrations, alkalinity, buffer capacities, water hardness, conductivity and others.

History. Version 1.0 was released in January 2012 (after a half-year test run in 2011). The project is active with 1-2 updates per month.

== Features ==
- Validates aqueous solutions (charge balance error, parameter adjustment)
- Calculates physico-chemical parameters: alkalinity, buffer capacities (ANC, BNC), water hardness, ionic strength
- Calculates aqueous speciation and complexation
- Calculates pH of solutions after addition of chemicals (acids, bases, salts)
- Calculates the calcite-carbonate system (closed/open CO_{2} system, Langelier Saturation Index)
- Calculates mineral dissolution, precipitation, and saturation indices
- Calculates mixing of two waters
- Calculates reduction-oxidation (redox) reactions
- Plots titration curves

== Fields of application ==
- Water analysis and water quality
- Geochemical modeling (in simplest form)
- Education

== Limits of application ==
- only inorganic species (no organic chemistry)
- only equilibrium thermodynamics (no chemical kinetics)
- only aqueous solutions with ionic strength ≤ 0.7 mol/L (no brines)

== Basic algorithm & numerical solver ==
There are two fundamental approaches in hydrochemistry: Law of mass action (LMA) and Gibbs energy minimization (GEM). The program aqion belongs to the category LMA approach. In a nutshell: A system of N_{B} independent basis components j (i.e. primary species), that combines to form N_{S} secondary species i, is represented by a set of mass-action and mass-balance equations:

(1) mass action law: $\{i\} \,=\, K_i \, \prod_{j=1}^{N_B} \,\{j\}^{\nu_{i,j}}$ with i = 1 ... N_{S}

(2) mass balance law: $[j]_{TOT} \,=\, [j] + \sum_{i=1}^{N_S}\, \nu_{i,j} \,[i]$ with j = 1 ... N_{B}

where K_{i} is the equilibrium constant of formation of the secondary species i, and ν_{i,j} represents the stoichiometric coefficient of basis species j in secondary species i (the values of ν_{j,i} can be positive or negative). Here, activities a_{i} are symbolized by curly brackets {i} while concentrations c_{i} by rectangular brackets [i]. Both quantities are related by the

(3) activity correction: $\{i\} \,=\, \gamma_{i} \, [i]$

with γ_{i} as the activity coefficient calculated by the Debye–Hückel equation and/or Davies equation. Inserting Eq.(1) into Eq.(2) yields a nonlinear polynomial function f_{j} for the j-th basis species:

(4) $f_j (c_1,c_2,...,c_{N_B}) \,=\, [j]_{TOT} - [j] - \sum^{N_S}_{i=1} \frac{\nu_{i,j}}{\gamma_i}\, K_i\, \prod^{N_B}_{k=1} \{k\}^{\nu_{i,k}} \,=\,0$

which is the objective function of the Newton–Raphson method.

To solve Eq.(4) aqion adopts the numerical solver from the open-source software PhreeqC. The equilibrium constants K_{i} are taken from the thermodynamic database wateq4f.

== Examples, test & verification ==
The software aqion is shipped with a set of example solutions (input waters) and a tutorial how to attack typical water-related problems (online-manual with about 40 examples). More examples and exercises for testing and re-run can be found in classical textbooks of hydrochemistry.

The program was verified by benchmark tests of specific industry standards.

== Screenshots ==
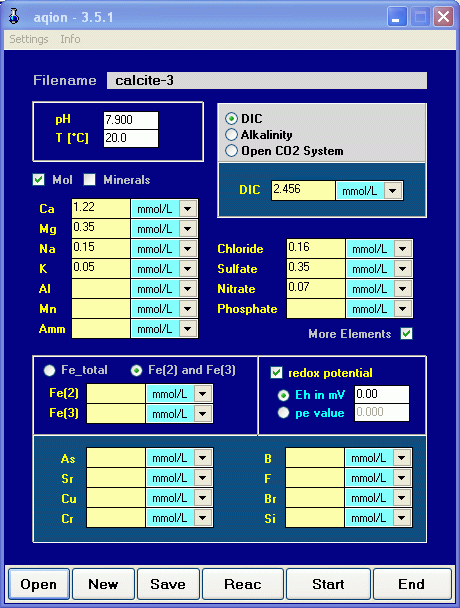
Input panel for chemical elements

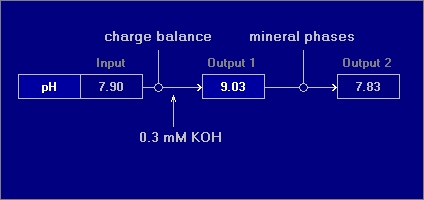
Output of pH calculator (example)

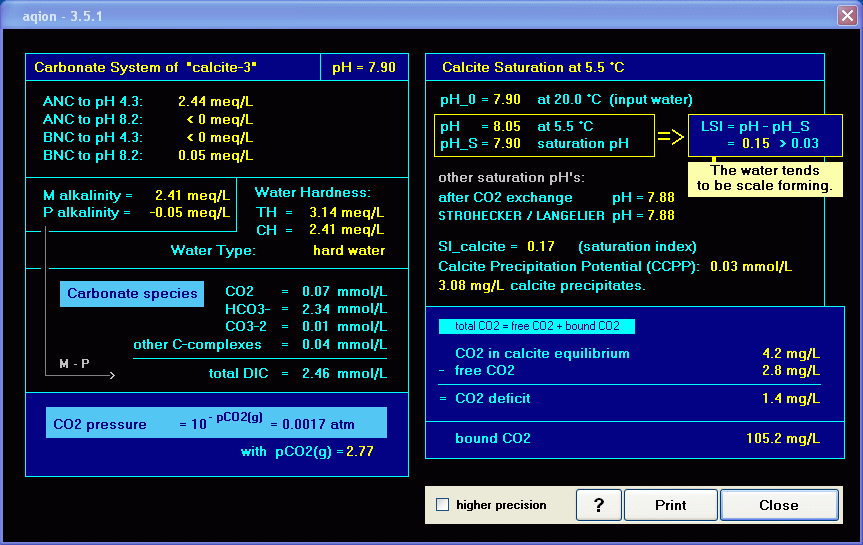
Calculated parameters of the calcite carbonate system

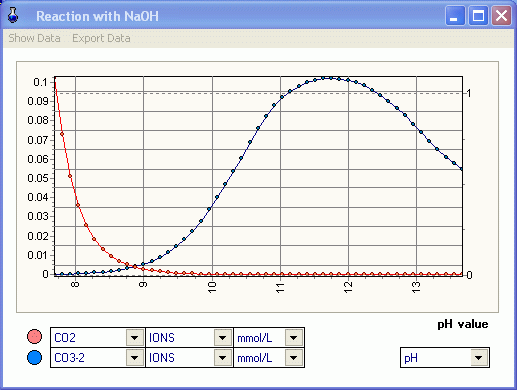
titration curves (example: addition of NaOH to a given input water)
