= Elias C. Aifantis =

Greek academic

- Born: October 10, 1950 (age 75); Thessaloniki, Greece
- Education: Aristotle University of Thessaloniki
- Children: Katerina Aifantis
- Scientific career
- Fields: Elasticity theory Plasticity theory Continuum mechanics
- Institutions: Aristotle University of Thessaloniki; University of Illinois; Michigan Technological University
- Website: users.auth.gr/users/0/3/022730/public_html/index3.htm

Elias C. Aifantis (Greek: Ηλίας Αϋφαντής; born October 10, 1950) is professor at Aristotle University of Thessaloniki, professor of Mechanical Engineering and Engineering Mechanics at Michigan Technological University since 1982.

He has held academic positions with the University of Illinois (1976–1980) and the University of Minnesota (1980–1982).

Aifantis received his diploma from the National Technical University of Athens and his Ph.D. from the University of Minnesota (1975).

He has more than 300 published papers in the areas of mechanics and materials science.

Aifantis is editor-in-chief of the Journal of Mechanical Behavior of Materials, and is on the advisory board of Mechanics of Cohesive Friction Materials and Structure. He was on the board of Acta Mechanica.

In 2015, he was awarded with the Fray International Sustainability Award in Antalya, Turkey, for his significant achievements in sustainable research and academia.

== See also ==
- GRADELA

== Selected papers ==
- E.C. Aifantis, "On the role of gradients in the localization of deformation and fracture", International Journal of Engineering Science. Vol.30. No.10. (1992) 1279–1299.
- B.S. Altan, E.C. Aifantis, "On the structure of the mode-Ill crack-tip in gradient elasticity", Scripta Metallurgica et Materialia. Vol.26. No.2. (1992) 319–324.
- B.S. Altan, E.C. Aifantis, "On some aspects in the special theory of gradient elasticity", Journal of the Mechanical Behaviour of Materials. Vol.8. No.3. (1997) 231-282.
- C.Q. Ru, E.C. Aifantis, "A simple approach to solve boundary-value problems in gradient elasticity", Acta Mechanica. Vol.101. No.1. (1993) 59-68.
- M.Yu. Gutkin, E.C. Aifantis, "Dislocations and disclinations in gradient elasticity", Physica Status Solidi B. Vol.214. No.2. (1999) 245-286.
- H. Askes, I. Morata, E. Aifantis, "Finite element analysis with staggered gradient elasticity", Computers and Structures. Vol.86. No.11-12. (2008) 1266–1279.
- H. Askes, E.C. Aifantis, "Gradient elasticity in statics and dynamics: An overview of formulations, length scale identification procedures, finite element implementations and new results", International Journal of Solids and Structures. Vol.48. No.13. (2011) 1962-1990.
