= Christopher Glein =

American geochemist

- Born: Christopher R. Glein
- Education: University of Washington (BS); Arizona State University (PhD)
- Scientific career
- Fields: Geochemistry
- Institutions: Southwest Research Institute
- Thesis: Theoretical and experimental studies of cryogenic and hydrothermal organic geochemistry (2012)
- Doctoral advisor: Everett L. Shock

Christopher R. Glein is an American geochemist at the Southwest Research Institute in San Antonio, TX. He studies planetary science, astrobiology, and organic geochemistry. Glein was the first to describe how Saturn's moon Enceladus is the only known body, besides Earth, that has all of the requirements necessary for life. Glein has been involved in multiple spacecraft missions, leading to significant findings about Pluto, Enceladus, and Titan. In 2017, he was recognized for Outstanding Contributions to the ESA Rosetta Mission by the European Space Agency.

== Education ==
Glein earned his B.S. from the University of Washington in 2006, where he majored in chemistry. He also completed a minor in earth and space sciences, and specialized in astrobiology and planetary science. In 2012, he earned his Ph.D. in geological sciences at Arizona State University with a dissertation titled “Theoretical and experimental studies of cryogenic and hydrothermal organic geochemistry.”

== Career ==
From 2012 to 2014, Glein was a postdoctoral fellow at the Carnegie Institution of Washington, and in 2014, at the University of Toronto. During his fellowships he focused on high pressure-temperature experimentation, and stable isotope geochemistry. In 2015, Glein began work as a research scientist at the Space Science and Engineering division of the Southwest Research Institute. He was promoted to a senior research scientist in 2018. Glein is a member of the American Geophysical Union, Deep Carbon Observatory, Geochemical Society, and Outer Planets Assessment Group. Currently he is involved in the Life Investigation For Enceladus (LIFE) mission, and the Enceladus Life Finder (ELF) mission.

== Research ==
While encompassing planetary science, astrobiology, and organic geochemistry, Glein's research focuses on the oceanography of planetary moons. Glein is currently studying two of Saturn's moons, Enceladus and Titan, to determine if they are able to host life. In a 2017 paper Glein describes how large hydrocarbons were found on both of Saturn's moons. Samples were taken from oceans on the moons by the spacecraft Cassini and analyzed using mass spectrometry. This finding proved Enceladus is the only known body, besides Earth, with all of the requirements necessary for life. Glein also helped discover that a reaction called serpentization takes place in Enceladus's ocean, making it an even stronger candidate for hosting life. Serpentization occurs when metallic rock reacts with water to form hydrogen. Glein postulates the form of hydrogen produced by the serpentization reaction on Enceladus is a possible source of energy for certain microbes. Glein is studying hydrocarbon containing samples, collected by Cassini, to further understand the origin of Titan's unique nitrogen-methane atmosphere. In addition to findings related to Saturn's moons, Glein has also made significant discoveries regarding Pluto. Analyzing samples brought back by the Rosetta mission, he found that Pluto contains notably similar amounts of nitrogen to comets explored by Rosetta, providing support for the theory that Pluto was formed by multiple comets.

== Honors and awards ==
In 2013, the Geological Society of Washington, D.C awarded Glein the Bradley Prize for Best Paper for his 2013 paper, “The exotic yet familiar geochemistry of Titan.” In 2017, the European Space Agency recognized Glein for his Outstanding Contributions to the ESA Rosetta Mission.

== Additional sources ==
- “Cassini finds final ingredient for alien life in Enceladus’s sea.” www.newscientist.com. Retrieved 2019-2-26.
- “Enceladus: A Habitable Environment?” solarsystem.nasa.gov. Retrieved on 2019-2-16.
- “Astrobio Top 10: Complex organic molecules discovered in Enceladus’ plumes could hint at life.” www.astrobio.net. Retrieved 2019-2-26.
- "Could life exist on Saturn’s moon Enceladus?” www.cnn.com. Retrieved 2019-2-26.

== See also ==
- Deep Carbon Observatory
