= The Geochemist's Workbench =

Software tools for solving problems in aqueous chemistry

- Developer: Aqueous Solutions LLC
- Stable release: 15.0 / January 11, 2021; 5 years ago
- Operating system: Microsoft Windows
- Type: Geochemical modeling, Reactive transport modeling software
- License: Proprietary
- Website: www.gwb.com

The Geochemist's Workbench (GWB) is an integrated set of interactive software tools for solving a range of problems in aqueous chemistry. The graphical user interface simplifies the use of the geochemical code.

== History ==
The GWB package was originally developed at the Department of Geology of the University of Illinois at Urbana-Champaign over a period of more than twenty years, under the sponsorship initially of a consortium of companies and government laboratories, and later through license fees paid by a community of users. In 2011, the GWB development team moved to the Research Park at the University of Illinois, and subsequently off campus in Champaign, IL, where they operate as an independent company named Aqueous Solutions LLC. Since its release, many thousands of licensed copies have been installed in more than 90 countries. In 2014, a free Student Edition of the software was released, and was later expanded in 2021 to a Community Edition free to all aqueous chemists.

An early version of the software was one of the first applications of parallel vector computing, the predecessor to today's multi-core processors, to geological research. The current release is multithreaded, and as such retains features of the early parallel vector architecture.

== Overview ==
The GWB is an integrated geochemical modeling package used for balancing chemical reactions, calculating stability diagrams and the equilibrium states of natural waters, tracing reaction processes, modeling reactive transport, plotting the results of these calculations, and storing the related data. The Workbench, designed for personal computers running Microsoft Windows, is distributed commercially in three packages: GWB Professional, Standard, and Essentials, as well as in the free GWB Community Edition.

GWB reads datasets of thermodynamic equilibrium constants (most commonly compiled from 0 to 300 °C along the steam saturation curve) with which it can calculate chemical equilibria. Thermodynamic datasets from other popular programs like PHREEQC, PHRQPITZ, WATEQ4F, and Visual MINTEQ have been formatted for the GWB, enabling comparison and validation of the different codes. The programs K2GWB, DBCreate, and logKcalc were written to generate thermodynamic data for GWB under pressures and temperatures beyond the limits of the default datasets. The GWB can couple chemical reaction with hydrologic transport to produce simulations known as reactive transport models. GWB can calculate flow fields dynamically, or import flow fields as numeric data or calculated directly from the USGS hydrologic flow code MODFLOW.

== Uses in science and industry ==
Geochemists working in the field, office, lab, or classroom store their analyses, calculate the distribution of chemical mass, create plots and diagrams, evaluate their experiments, and solve real-world problems.

The software is used by environmental chemists, engineers, microbiologists, and remediators to gain quantitative understanding of the chemical and microbiological reactions which control the fate and mobility of contaminants in the biosphere. With this knowledge, they can develop predictive models of contaminant fate and transport, and test the effectiveness of costly remediation schemes before implementing them in the field.

Within the energy industry, petroleum engineers, mining geologists, environmental geochemists and geothermal energy developers use the software to search for resources, optimize recovery, and manage wastes, all while using safe and environmentally friendly practices. Geoscientists manage the side effects of energy production in carbon sequestration projects and in the design of nuclear waste repositories.

== Uses in education ==
Hundreds of scholarly articles cite or use GWB and several textbooks apply the software to solve common problems in environmental protection and remediation, the petroleum industry, and economic geology.

Geochemistry students can save time performing routine but tedious tasks that are easily accomplished with the software. Instead of balancing chemical reactions and constructing Eh-pH diagrams by hand, for example, students can spend time exploring advanced topics like multi-component equilibrium, kinetic theory, or reactive transport. A free download of The Geochemist's Workbench Community Edition is available from the developer's website.

== See also ==
- Earth Science
- Environmental Engineering
- Groundwater
- Geochemistry
- Hydrogeology
- Groundwater model
- Geochemical model
- Reactive transport model
