= List of operator splitting topics =

This is a list of operator splitting topics.

== General ==
- Alternating direction implicit method — finite difference method for parabolic, hyperbolic, and elliptic partial differential equations
- GRADELA — simple gradient elasticity model
- Matrix splitting — general method of splitting a matrix operator into a sum or difference of matrices
- Paul Tseng — resolved question on convergence of matrix splitting algorithms
- PISO algorithm — pressure-velocity calculation for Navier-Stokes equations
- Projection method (fluid dynamics) — computational fluid dynamics method
- Reactive transport modeling in porous media — modeling of chemical reactions and fluid flow through the Earth's crust
- Richard S. Varga — developed matrix splitting
- Strang splitting — specific numerical method for solving differential equations using operator splitting
