= Hal Helgeson =

American geochemist (1932–2007)

- Born: Harold C. Helgeson; November 13, 1931; Minneapolis, Minnesota, U.S.
- Died: May 28, 2007 (aged 75); Berkeley, California, U.S.
- Education: Michigan State University (BS); Harvard University (PhD)
- Awards: Urey Medal; V. M. Goldschmidt Award
- Scientific career
- Fields: Geochemistry
- Workplaces: Northwestern University; University of California, Berkeley
- Doctoral advisor: Robert M. Garrels
- Doctoral students: Everett Shock
- Military career
- Allegiance: United States
- Branch: United States Air Force
- Service years: 1954–1956
- Unit: 497th Reconnaissance Technical Squadron

Harold C. Helgeson (November 13, 1931 – May 28, 2007) was an American scientist and educator. A pioneering theoretical geochemist, he was a professor at the University of California, Berkeley.

== Early life ==
Born in Minneapolis, Minnesota, he grew up in St. Paul. He received a B.S. in geology at Michigan State University in 1953. Helgeson went to Harvard University for graduate school, supervised by Robert M. Garrels. Helgeson received his Ph.D. in 1962.
