= Schur decomposition =

Matrix factorisation in mathematics

In linear algebra, the Schur decomposition or Schur triangulation, named after Issai Schur, is a matrix decomposition. It allows one to write an arbitrary complex square matrix as unitarily similar to an upper triangular matrix whose diagonal elements are the eigenvalues of the original matrix.

== Statement ==
The complex Schur decomposition reads as follows: if A is an n × n square matrix with complex entries, then A can be expressed as
$$A = Q U Q^{-1}$$
for some unitary matrix Q (so that the inverse Q^{−1} is also the conjugate transpose Q* of Q), and some upper triangular matrix U. This is called a Schur form of A. Since U is similar to A, it has the same spectrum, and since it is triangular, its eigenvalues are the diagonal entries of U.

The Schur decomposition implies that there exists a nested sequence of A-invariant subspaces {0} = V_{0} ⊂ V_{1} ⊂ ⋯ ⊂ V_{n} = C^{n}, and that there exists an ordered orthonormal basis (for the standard Hermitian form of C^{n}) such that the first i basis vectors span V_{i} for each i occurring in the nested sequence. Phrased somewhat differently, the first part says that a linear operator J on a complex finite-dimensional vector space stabilizes a complete flag (V_{1}, ..., V_{n}).

There is also a real Schur decomposition. If A is an n × n square matrix with real entries, then A can be expressed as
$$A = Q H Q^{-1}$$
where Q is an orthogonal matrix and H is either upper or lower quasi-triangular. A quasi-triangular matrix is a matrix that when expressed as a block matrix of 2 × 2 and 1 × 1 blocks is triangular. This is a stronger property than being Hessenberg. Just as in the complex case, a family of commuting real matrices {A_{i}} may be simultaneously brought to quasi-triangular form by an orthogonal matrix. There exists an orthogonal matrix Q such that, for every A_{i} in the given family,
$$H_i = Q A_i Q^{-1}$$
is upper quasi-triangular.

== Proof ==
A constructive proof for the Schur decomposition is as follows: every operator A on a complex finite-dimensional vector space has an eigenvalue λ, corresponding to some eigenspace V_{λ}. Let V_{λ}^{⊥} be its orthogonal complement. It is clear that, with respect to this orthogonal decomposition, A has matrix representation (one can pick here any orthonormal bases Z_{1} and Z_{2} spanning V_{λ} and V_{λ}^{⊥} respectively)
$$\begin{bmatrix} Z_1 & Z_2 \end{bmatrix}^{*} A \begin{bmatrix}Z_1 & Z_2\end{bmatrix} = \begin{bmatrix} \lambda \, I_{\lambda} & A_{12} \\ 0 & A_{22} \end{bmatrix}:
\begin{matrix}
V_{\lambda} \\
\oplus \\
V_{\lambda}^{\perp}
\end{matrix}
\rightarrow
\begin{matrix}
V_{\lambda} \\
\oplus \\
V_{\lambda}^{\perp}
\end{matrix}$$
where I_{λ} is the identity operator on V_{λ}. The above matrix would be upper-triangular except for the A_{22} block. But exactly the same procedure can be applied to the sub-matrix A_{22}, viewed as an operator on V_{λ}^{⊥}, and its submatrices. Continue this way until the resulting matrix is upper triangular. Since each conjugation increases the dimension of the upper-triangular block by at least one, this process takes at most n steps. Thus the space C^{n} will be exhausted and the procedure has yielded the desired result.

The above argument can be slightly restated as follows: let λ be an eigenvalue of A, corresponding to some eigenspace V_{λ}. A induces an operator T on the quotient space C^{n}/V_{λ}. This operator is precisely the A_{22} submatrix from above. As before, T would have an eigenspace, say W_{μ} ⊂ C^{n} modulo V_{λ}. Notice the preimage of W_{μ} under the quotient map is an invariant subspace of A that contains V_{λ}. Continue this way until the resulting quotient space has dimension 0. Then the successive preimages of the eigenspaces found at each step form a flag that A stabilizes.

== Notes ==
Although every square matrix has a Schur decomposition, in general this decomposition is not unique. For example, the eigenspace V_{λ} can have dimension > 1, in which case any orthonormal basis for V_{λ} would lead to the desired result.

Write the triangular matrix U as U = D + N, where D is diagonal and N is strictly upper triangular (and thus a nilpotent matrix). The diagonal matrix D contains the eigenvalues of A in arbitrary order (hence its Frobenius norm, squared, is the sum of the squared moduli of the eigenvalues of A, while the Frobenius norm of A, squared, is the sum of the squared singular values of A). The nilpotent part N is generally not unique either, but its Frobenius norm is uniquely determined by A (just because the Frobenius norm of A is equal to the Frobenius norm of U = D + N).

It is clear that if A is a normal matrix, then U from its Schur decomposition must be a diagonal matrix and the column vectors of Q are the eigenvectors of A. Therefore, the Schur decomposition extends the spectral decomposition. In particular, if A is positive definite, the Schur decomposition of A, its spectral decomposition, and its singular value decomposition coincide.

A commuting family {A_{i}} of matrices can be simultaneously triangularized, i.e. there exists a unitary matrix Q such that, for every A_{i} in the given family, Q A_{i} Q* is upper triangular. This can be readily deduced from the above proof. Take element A from {A_{i}} and again consider an eigenspace V_{A}. Then V_{A} is invariant under all matrices in {A_{i}}. Therefore, all matrices in {A_{i}} must share one common eigenvector in V_{A}. Induction then proves the claim. As a corollary, we have that every commuting family of normal matrices can be simultaneously diagonalized.

In the infinite dimensional setting, not every bounded operator on a Banach space has an invariant subspace. However, the upper-triangularization of an arbitrary square matrix does generalize to compact operators. Every compact operator on a complex Banach space has a nest of closed invariant subspaces.

== Computation ==
The Schur decomposition of a given matrix is numerically computed by the QR algorithm or its variants. In other words, the roots of the characteristic polynomial corresponding to the matrix are not necessarily computed ahead in order to obtain its Schur decomposition. Conversely, the QR algorithm can be used to compute the roots of any given characteristic polynomial by finding the Schur decomposition of its companion matrix. Similarly, the QR algorithm is used to compute the eigenvalues of any given matrix, which are the diagonal entries of the upper triangular matrix of the Schur decomposition. Its complexity is $\mathcal{O}(n^3)$.

== Applications ==
Lie theory applications include:

- Every invertible operator is contained in a Borel group.
- Every operator fixes a point of the flag manifold.

== Generalized Schur decomposition ==
Given square matrices A and B, the generalized Schur decomposition factorizes both matrices as $A = QSZ^*$ and $B = QTZ^*$, where Q and Z are unitary, and S and T are upper triangular. The generalized Schur decomposition is also sometimes called the QZ decomposition.

The generalized eigenvalues $\lambda$ that solve the generalized eigenvalue problem $A\mathbf{x}=\lambda B\mathbf{x}$ (where x is an unknown nonzero vector) can be calculated as the ratio of the diagonal elements of S to those of T. That is, using subscripts to denote matrix elements, the ith generalized eigenvalue $\lambda_i$ satisfies $\lambda_i = S_{ii} / T_{ii}$.
