= Hermite interpolation =

Polynomial interpolation using derivative values

In numerical analysis, Hermite interpolation, named after Charles Hermite, generalizes polynomial interpolation, which includes Lagrange interpolation and Newton interpolation. Polynomial interpolation allows computing a unique polynomial of degree less than $n$ that takes specified values at $n$ given distinct nodes, which are the points where the values are specified, where these values are either given or sampled from a given function. Instead, Hermite interpolation computes a unique polynomial of degree less than $n$ such that the polynomial and its first few derivatives take specified values at $m$ (fewer than $n$) given distinct nodes, where these derivative values, with the 0th derivative values being the function values, are either given or sampled from a given function. The number of pieces of information, consisting of these derivative values, must add up to $n$. It also generalizes Taylor polynomial interpolation as the special case where there is only a single given node. The resulting unique polynomial is commonly known as the Hermite interpolating polynomial or the Hermite interpolant.

There are various methods for computing and formulating the Hermite interpolating polynomial. As Hermite interpolation generalizes Newton interpolation, both can be derived from the calculation of divided differences. Alternatively, one can use linear algebra, by taking the coefficients of the interpolating polynomial as unknowns, and writing as linear equations the constraints that the interpolating polynomial must satisfy. Other approaches include explicit closed-form formulas and the barycentric form, the latter of which enables efficient updating of the interpolating polynomial when adding new distinct nodes or higher-order derivative values. Further advanced or specialized techniques include the Chinese remainder theorem approach, the orthogonal projection method, and Hermite’s original approach using contour integration, which also yields an error function formulation.

In matrix theory, Hermite interpolating polynomials are also related to the evaluation of matrix functions and generalized eigenspace projection via generalized Frobenius covariants.

== Hermite interpolation problem ==
In a restricted formulation, Hermite interpolation consists of computing a polynomial function of degree as low as possible such that the polynomial function and its first $r$ derivatives take specified values at $m$ given distinct nodes, where these derivative values, with the 0th derivative values being the function values, are either given or sampled from a given differentiable function. This means that one starts from $n = m (r + 1)$ constraints, each consisting of one of the following given pairs of node and derivative values:
$$\begin{matrix}
(x_1, y_1),       & (x_2, y_2),       & \ldots, & (x_m, y_m),      \\[1ex]
(x_1, y_1'),      & (x_2, y_2'),      & \ldots, & (x_m, y_m'),     \\[1ex]
\vdots            & \vdots            &         & \vdots           \\[1.2ex]
(x_1, y_1^{(r)}), & (x_2, y_2^{(r)}), & \ldots, & (x_m, y_m^{(r)})
\end{matrix}$$
As a polynomial of degree less than $n$ is defined by $n$ coefficients, the resulting polynomial must have a degree less than $n$, since, otherwise, the solution could not be unique. In a more general case, there is no need for $r$ to have a fixed value; that is, some points may have more known derivatives than others. In this case the resulting polynomial has a degree less than the total number of constraints $n$.

A theorem, commonly known as the Hermite interpolation theorem, asserts the existence and uniqueness of the resulting polynomial.

Let us consider a polynomial $h$ of degree less than $n$ with indeterminate coefficients; that is, the coefficients of $h$ are $n$ new variables. Then, by writing the constraints that the interpolating polynomial must satisfy, one gets a system of $n$ linear equations in $n$ unknowns.

Hermite used contour integration to prove that this is effectively the case here, and to find the unique solution, provided that the $x_i$ are pairwise different. Hermite interpolation can be viewed as a problem of linear algebra that has the coefficients of the interpolation polynomial as unknown variables and a confluent Vandermonde matrix as its matrix. The general methods of linear algebra, and specific methods for confluent Vandermonde matrices are often used for computing the interpolation polynomial, as detailed in § Linear algebra approach. Various other methods and approaches exist, which are described in later sections.

=== Notation and setup ===
In the general formulation, for a given set of $m$ distinct nodes $x_1, \dots, x_m$ in any field of characteristic zero, with associated maximum derivative orders $r_1, \dots, r_m$ and associated multiplicities $n_1, \dots, n_m$ satisfying $n_i = r_i + 1$, let $\textstyle n = \sum_{i=1}^m n_i$ be the total number of interpolation conditions. The Hermite interpolating polynomial $h$ is the unique polynomial of degree less than $n$ that satisfies the interpolation conditions:
$$h^{(j)}(x_i) = y_{i,j} \quad \text{for } i = 1, \dots, m \text{ and } j = 0, \dots, r_i,$$
where the specified derivative values $y_{i,j}$, with the 0th derivative values $y_{i,0}$ being the function values, are in the same field as the $x_i$.

The specified derivative values $y_{i,j}$ are either given or sampled from a given target function $f$ such that $\textstyle f^{(j)}(x_i) = y_{i,j}$. Many methods and concepts in Hermite interpolation, such as the original Hermite interpolation problem posed in Hermite's paper, are framed around a target function $f$. However, when only the derivative values $y_{i,j}$ are given, one can view them as originating from any of infinitely many possible implicit target functions. One possible implicit target function with zero interpolation error is the corresponding Hermite interpolating polynomial itself, whose existence is asserted by the Hermite interpolation theorem.

For each node $x_i$, let $g_i$ be the local $r_i$th degree Taylor polynomial of both $h$ and $f$ at $x_i$, constructed from the derivative values $y_{i,j}$:
$$g_i(x) = \sum_{j=0}^{r_i} \frac{y_{i,j}}{j!} (x - x_i)^j.$$

Furthermore, it is convenient to introduce polynomials that frequently appear in various methods for constructing Hermite interpolating polynomials:
$$p_i(x) = (x - x_i)^{n_i}, \quad q = \prod_{i=1}^m p_i, \quad q_i = \frac{q}{p_i} = \prod_{j \neq i} p_j.$$

The Hermite interpolating polynomial $h$ can also be expressed as a linear combination of basis polynomials $h_{i,j}$:
$$h = \sum y_{i,j} h_{i,j} = \sum_{i=1}^m \sum_{j=0}^{r_i} y_{i,j} h_{i,j}.$$

Throughout the remaining sections, unless otherwise noted, the notation and conventions established above will be followed.

== Explicit formula ==
=== Explicit Taylor expansion formula ===
An explicit closed-form formula, first introduced in its original form by Arthur Buchheim in 1886, is given by:
$$h(x) = \sum_{i=1}^m \underbrace{\left[ \sum_{j=0}^{r_i} \frac{(f/q_i)^{(j)}(x_i)}{j!} (x - x_i)^j \right]}_{\mathcal{T}_{x_i}^{r_i} \left[ f/q_i \right](x)} q_i(x),$$
where $\textstyle \mathcal{T}_{a}^{k}[f]$ denotes the $k$th degree Taylor operator of a function $f$ centered at $a$.

For each node $x_i$, note that the local $r_i$th degree Taylor polynomial $g_i$ satisfies $\textstyle g_i = \mathcal{T}_{x_i}^{r_i}[f]$. Consider the case when only the derivative values $y_{i,j}$ are given. Using the Taylor composition theorem, $f$ can be directly substituted with $g_i$ inside any occurrence of the $r_i$th degree Taylor operator at $x_i$, giving the explicit closed-form formula in terms of the derivative values:
$$h(x) = \sum_{i=1}^m \mathcal{T}_{x_i}^{r_i} \!\left[ \frac{g_i}{q_i} \right]\!(x) \, q_i(x).$$

When $r_i = 0$ for all distinct nodes $x_i$, meaning only function values are specified, this explicit closed-form formula reduces directly to the explicit formula of Lagrange polynomials.

==== Basis polynomials via Taylor expansion ====
An explicit closed-form expression for each basis polynomial $h_{i,j}$ can be obtained directly by prescribing $y_{k,l} = \delta_{i k} \delta_{j l}$ for $k = 1,\dots,m$ and $l = 0,\dots,r_k$, where $\delta_{a b}$ denotes the Kronecker delta, and constructing the corresponding prescribed local Taylor polynomials:
$$\begin{align}
g_k(x) &= (x - x_i)^j / j! && \text{for } k = i \text{ and} \\
g_k(x) &= 0                  && \text{for } k \neq i.
\end{align}$$
Substituting $g_k$ into the explicit formula yields:
$$h_{i,j}(x) = \mathcal{T}_{\xi=x_i}^{r_i} \!\left[ \frac{1}{j!} \frac{(\xi - x_i)^j}{q_i(\xi)} \right]\!(x) \, q_i(x).$$

Following the § Alternative basis construction via degree-0 basis polynomials, the full set of basis polynomials can be constructed entirely using only the degree-0 basis polynomial $h_{i,0}$. For $h_{i,0}$, the local Taylor polynomials simplify to $g_k(x) = \delta_{i k}$, giving the explicit closed-form expression:
$$h_{i,0}(x) = \mathcal{T}_{x_i}^{r_i} \!\left[ \frac{1}{q_i} \right]\!(x) \, q_i(x).$$

=== Explicit recursive formula ===
A recursively-defined explicit basis polynomial expression is given by:
$$h_{i,j}(x) = \frac{(x - x_i)^j}{j!} q_i(x) - \sum_{k=j+1}^{r_i} \binom{k}{j} q_i^{(k-j)}(x_i) h_{i,k}(x),$$
with $h_{i,r_i}$ serving as the base case. The Hermite interpolating polynomial $h$ can then be constructed as $\textstyle h = \sum y_{i,j} h_{i,j}$.

=== Explicit congruence formula ===
An explicit formula requiring only basic algebraic operations and polynomial reduction is given by Bossoney and Troyanov:
$$h(x) = \sum_{i=1}^m g_i(x) \underbrace{\left[ 1 - \left( 1 - \frac{q_i(x)}{q_i(x_i)} \right)^{n_i} \right]}_{h_i(x)} \bmod q(x),$$
where $h_i$ is the basic Hermite interpolating polynomial at node $x_i$.

Alternatively, the degree-0 basis polynomials are given by polynomial reduction as $h_{i,0} = h_i \bmod q$, and a full basis can be constructed as described in § Alternative basis construction via degree-0 basis polynomials.

== Chinese remainder theorem approach ==
In this approach, the interpolation conditions $\textstyle h^{(j)}(x_i) = y_{i,j}$ imply the desired polynomial $h$ is congruent to $g_i$ modulo $p_i$, for $i = 1,\dots,m$. The Chinese remainder theorem for polynomials implies that there is exactly one solution of degree less than $n$. Moreover, this solution can be computed with $\textstyle O(n^2)$ arithmetic operations, or even faster with fast polynomial multiplication.

=== Construction via Chinese remainder theorem ===
For general Hermite interpolation, one way to construct a solution satisfying the system of simultaneous congruences is to follow the constructive proof of the Chinese remainder theorem; another is to use the Chinese remainder algorithm as follows.

The Hermite interpolating polynomial $h$ must satisfy the system of modular equivalences:
$$h \equiv g_i \pmod{p_i} \quad \text{for } i = 1, \dots, m.$$

At node $x_i$, since $q_i$ and $p_i$ share no common roots, they are coprime. By Bézout's identity, there exist polynomials $u_i$ and $v_i$ satisfying:
$$u_i q_i + v_i p_i = 1.$$
The polynomials $u_i$ and $v_i$ can be computed together using the polynomial extended Euclidean algorithm. Alternatively, because the polynomial $v_i$ is not required for the construction, $u_i$ can be computed directly using the polynomial version of the half extended Euclidean algorithm that tracks only one set of Bézout coefficients.

Define $w_i$ as the polynomial reduction:
$$w_i = g_i u_i \bmod{p_i}.$$
The final interpolating polynomial $h$ is obtained by:
$$h = \sum_{i=1}^m w_i q_i.$$

=== Basis polynomials via Chinese remainder theorem ===
Following § Alternative basis construction via degree-0 basis polynomials, a full basis can be constructed by computing only the degree-0 basis polynomials $h_{i,0}$, which can be obtained in a simplified manner.

For each node $x_i$, the degree-0 basis polynomial $h_{i,0}$ must satisfy:
$$h_{i,0} \equiv (g_j = \delta_{ij}) \pmod{p_j} \quad \text{for } j = 1,\dots,m,$$
where $\delta_{ab}$ denotes the Kronecker delta.

For $j \neq i$, the $j$th modular equivalence can be satisfied by choosing $w_j=0$, causing the cross terms to vanish in $\textstyle h_{i,0} = \sum_{j=1}^m w_j q_j$ and reducing the expression to $h_{i,0} = w_i q_i$. Taking the remaining $i$th Bézout's identity $u_i q_i + v_i p_i = 1$ modulo $p_i$, the term $v_i p_i$ vanishes, showing that $u_i$ is a modular multiplicative inverse of $q_i$:
$$u_i q_i \equiv 1 \pmod{p_i}.$$
Because the degree of the modular inverse $u_i$ obtained via the extended Euclidean algorithm is strictly less than $\deg(p_i) = n_i$ and $g_i(x)=1$, $\textstyle w_i = g_i u_i \bmod{p_i}$ reduces to $w_i=u_i$, yielding directly the unique degree-0 basis polynomial
$$h_{i,0} = u_i q_i.$$

For any individual simple node $x_i$ with no derivative conditions ($r_i = 0$), $p_i(x) = x - x_i$. By the polynomial remainder theorem, the modular condition $\textstyle u_i(x) q_i(x) \equiv 1 \pmod{x - x_i}$ simplifies to the point evaluation $u_i(x_i) q_i(x_i) = 1$. In this case, $u_i$ reduces to a scalar constant that can be evaluated directly in closed form:
$$u_i(x) = \frac{1}{q_i(x_i)} = \prod_{j \neq i} \frac{1}{p_j(x_i)}.$$

== Newton's divided difference method ==
An efficient way to construct the Hermite interpolating polynomial $h$ is by extending Newton's divided difference method. Since Newton interpolation and Lagrange interpolation construct the exact same unique polynomial for a distinct set of nodes, Newton's method can be generalized to the confluent case where distinct nodes coalesce via confluent divided differences.

In this approach, having a target function $f$, either given or implicit, makes it more intuitive to understand divided differences, although they are equally well-defined using solely the derivative values $y_{i,j}$. The original set of nodes is transformed into a sequence of repeated nodes $z_1, \dots, z_n$ by repeating each node $x_i$ according to its multiplicity $n_i$ times:
$$(z_1, \dots, z_n) = (\underbrace{x_1, \dots, x_1}_{n_1 \text{ times}}, \underbrace{x_2, \dots, x_2}_{n_2 \text{ times}}, \dots, \underbrace{x_m, \dots, x_m}_{n_m \text{ times}}).$$
When constructing the divided difference table for this sequence of repeated nodes, the standard finite difference quotient for identical confluent nodes would result in an undefined $0/0$ expression; these entries are directly replaced by the corresponding scaled derivative values $\textstyle f^{(j)}(x_i)/j!$ (or $y_{i,j}/j!$). The interpolating polynomial is then represented in Newton form:
$$h(x) = \sum_{i=1}^n f[z_1, \dots, z_i] \, \underbrace{\textstyle \prod_{j=1}^{i-1} (x - z_j)}_{h_i(x)},$$
where $\textstyle \{ h_i \}_{i=1}^n$ is commonly known as the Newton basis. Once the target function and derivative values are known, this generalized construction requires only basic algebraic operations (addition, subtraction, multiplication, and division) to compute the divided difference table and construct the polynomial.

=== Simple case with only first derivatives ===
Here we will consider only the simplest case $r_i = 1$ for all distinct nodes. Therefore, given $m$ distinct nodes $x_1, \ldots, x_m$, and values $f(x_1), \ldots, f(x_m)$ and $f'(x_1), \ldots, f'(x_m)$, we create a new sequence of repeated nodes $z_1, \ldots, z_{2m}$ such that
$$z_{2i-1} = z_{2i} = x_i.$$

Now, we create a divided differences table for the sequence of repeated nodes $z_1, \ldots, z_{2m}$. However, for some divided differences,
$$z_i = z_{i + 1}
\implies f[z_i, z_{i+1}] = \frac{f(z_{i+1})-f(z_{i})}{z_{i+1}-z_{i}} = \frac{0}{0}$$
which is undefined. In this case, the divided difference is replaced by $f'(z_i)$. All others are calculated normally.

=== General case for higher-order derivatives ===
In the general case, suppose a given node $x_i$ has up to $r_i$th order derivatives. Then the sequence of repeated nodes $z_1, \ldots, z_n$ contains $n_i$ adjacent identical copies of $x_i$. When creating the table, divided differences of $j + 1$ (for $j = 0, \ldots, r_i$) identical values will be calculated as
$$f[\underbrace{x_i,\dots,x_i}_{j+1 \text{ times}}]=\frac{f^{(j)}(x_i)}{j!}.$$

A fast algorithm for the fully general case is given by Schneider and Werner. A slower but more numerically stable algorithm is given by Corless and Fillion.

=== Example ===
==== Case of uniform derivative orders ====
Consider the function $\textstyle f(x) = x^8 + 1$. Evaluating the function and its first two derivatives at $x \in \{-1, 0, 1\}$, we obtain the following data:

$x$	$f(x)$	$f'(x)$	$f''(x)$
−1	2	−8	56
0	1	0	0
1	2	8	56

Since we have two derivatives to work with, we construct the sequence of repeated nodes
$$(z_i, \ldots, z_n) = (-1, -1, -1, 0, 0, 0, 1, 1, 1).$$
Our divided difference table is then:
$$\begin{array}{llcclrrrrr}
z_1 = -1  &  f[z_1] = 2  &                          &                         &                           &      &     &   &    & \\
&              &  \tfrac1{1!}f'(z_1) = -8  &                         &                           &      &     &   &    & \\
z_2 = -1  &  f[z_2] = 2  &                          & \tfrac1{2!}f''(z_2) = 28 &                           &      &     &   &    & \\
&              &  \tfrac1{1!}f'(z_2) = -8  &                         &  f[z_4,z_3,z_2,z_1] = -21 &      &     &   &    & \\
z_3 = -1  &  f[z_3] = 2  &                          & f[z_4,z_3,z_2] = 7      &                           &  15  &     &   &    & \\
&              &  f[z_4,z_3] = -1         &                         &  f[z_5,z_4,z_3,z_2] = -6  &      & -10 &   &    & \\
z_4 =  0  &  f[z_4] = 1  &                          & f[z_5,z_4,z_3] = 1      &                           &   5  &     & 4 &    & \\
&              &  \tfrac1{1!}f'(z_4) = 0   &                         &  f[z_6,z_5,z_4,z_3] = -1  &      &  -2 &   & -1 & \\
z_5 =  0  &  f[z_5] = 1  &                          & \tfrac1{2!}f''(z_5) = 0  &                           &   1  &     & 2 &    & 1 \\
&              &  \tfrac1{1!}f'(z_5) = 0   &                         &  f[z_7,z_6,z_5,z_4] =  1  &      &   2 &   &  1 & \\
z_6 =  0  &  f[z_6] = 1  &                          & f[z_7,z_6,z_5] = 1      &                           &   5  &     & 4 &    & \\
&              &  f[z_7,z_6] = 1          &                         &  f[z_8,z_7,z_6,z_5] =  6  &      &  10 &   &    & \\
z_7 =  1  &  f[z_7] = 2  &                          & f[z_8,z_7,z_6] = 7      &                           &  15  &     &   &    & \\
&              &  \tfrac1{1!}f'(z_7) = 8   &                         &  f[z_9,z_8,z_7,z_6] =  21 &      &     &   &    & \\
z_8 =  1  &  f[z_8] = 2  &                          & \tfrac1{2!}f''(z_8) = 28 &                           &      &     &   &    & \\
&              &  \tfrac1{1!}f'(z_8) = 8   &                         &                           &      &     &   &    & \\
z_9 =  1  &  f[z_9] = 2  &                          &                         &                           &      &     &   &    & \\
\end{array}$$
and by taking the coefficients from the diagonal of the divided difference table, and multiplying the $i$th coefficient by $\textstyle \prod_{j=1}^{i-1} (x - z_j)$, as we would when constructing Newton form to generate a Newton polynomial, the generated polynomial $h$ is
$$\begin{align}
h(x) &= 2 - 8(x+1) + 28(x+1) ^2 - 21 (x+1)^3 + 15x(x+1)^3 - 10x^2(x+1)^3 \\
&\qquad{} + 4x^3(x+1)^3 -1x^3(x+1)^3(x-1)+x^3(x+1)^3(x-1)^2 \\[5pt]
&=2 - 8 + 28 - 21 - 8x + 56x - 63x + 15x + 28x^2 - 63x^2 + 45x^2 - 10x^2 - 21x^3 \\
&\qquad{} + 45x^3 - 30x^3 + 4x^3 + x^3 + x^3 + 15x^4 - 30x^4 + 12x^4 + 2x^4 + x^4 \\
&\qquad{} - 10x^5 + 12x^5 - 2x^5 + 4x^5 - 2x^5 - 2x^5 - x^6 + x^6 - x^7 + x^7 + x^8 \\[5pt]
&= x^8 + 1.
\end{align}$$

==== Case of non-uniform derivative orders ====
Consider the following set of given derivative values $y_{i,j}$ at nodes $x_i \in \{-1, 0, 1\}$:

$i$	$x_i$	$y_{i,0}$	$y_{i,1}$
1	−1	1	2
2	0	1	
3	1	-1	-2

For this example with non-uniform derivative orders, we construct the sequence of repeated nodes
$$(z_1,\ldots,z_n) = (-1,-1,0,1,1).$$
Denoting the divided differences as $f[z_a, \dots, z_b]$ when constructed from the given derivative values $y_{i,j}$ via an implicit target function $f$, the constructed divided difference table is given by:
$$\begin{array}{llclrr}
z_1 = -1  &  f[z_1] = y_{1,0} = 1   &                             &                       &              &     \\
&                         &  \tfrac1{1!}y_{1,1} = 2     &                       &              &     \\
z_2 = -1  &  f[z_2] = y_{1,0} = 1   &                             &  f[z_3,z_2,z_1] = -2  &              &     \\
&                         &  f[z_3,z_2] = \phantom{-}0  &                       &  \tfrac1{2}  &     \\
z_3 = 0   &  f[z_3] = y_{2,0} = 1   &                             &  f[z_4,z_3,z_2] = -1  &              &  0  \\
&                         &  f[z_4,z_3] = -2            &                       &  \tfrac1{2}  &     \\
z_4 = 1   &  f[z_4] = y_{3,0} = -1  &                             &  f[z_5,z_4,z_3] = 0   &              &     \\
&                         &  \tfrac1{1!}y_{3,1} = -2    &                       &              &     \\
z_5 = 1   &  f[z_5] = y_{3,0} = -1  &                             &                       &              &     \\
\end{array}$$
and the generated polynomial $h$ in Newton form is
$$\begin{align}
h(x) &= 1 + 2(x+1) - 2(x+1)^2 + \frac{1}{2}x(x+1)^2 + 0x(x+1)^2(x-1) \\
&= \frac{1}{2}x^3 - x^2 - \frac{3}{2}x + 1.
\end{align}$$

=== Reduction to Taylor polynomial interpolation ===
In the special case where there is only a single node, the Newton form becomes
$$h(x) = \sum_{k=0}^{r_1} f[\underbrace{x_1,\dots,x_1}_{k+1 \text{ times}}] (x-x_1)^k,$$
which is exactly equal to the $r_1$th degree Taylor polynomial $T_{r_1}$ of $f$ centered at $x_1$:
$$h(x) = T_{r_1}(x) = \sum_{k=0}^{r_1} \frac{f^{(k)}(x_1)}{k!} (x-x_1)^k.$$

=== Confluent divided differences via contour integration ===
Through Cauchy's integral formula for confluent divided differences, constructing the Hermite interpolating polynomial via divided differences can also be viewed as a contour integration approach, providing an alternative formulation to the integral representation described in § Hermite's contour integral.

When $f$ is given and analytic on a simply connected domain $\Omega \subset \C$ containing the distinct nodes $x_1, \dots, x_m$, substituting Cauchy's integral formula into the Newton form yields:
$$h(z) = \frac{1}{2\pi i} \sum_{i=1}^n \oint_{\Gamma} \frac{f(\zeta)}{\prod_{j=1}^i (\zeta - z_j)} \, d\zeta \prod_{j=1}^{i-1} (z - z_j),$$
where $\Gamma$ is a positively oriented, simple closed contour in $\Omega$ enclosing these distinct nodes.

== Linear algebra approach ==
The interpolation problem can also be formulated and solved directly using linear algebra in a similar way to Lagrange interpolation, by replacing the standard Vandermonde matrix with a confluent Vandermonde matrix to account for derivative values at each node.

Let $V$ be the $n \times n$ confluent Vandermonde matrix and $\mathbf y$ be an $n \times 1$ vector of interpolation conditions. The matrix $V$ and the vector $\mathbf y$ are given by:
$$V = \begin{pmatrix} V_1 \\ \vdots \\ V_m \end{pmatrix}, \quad
\mathbf y = \begin{pmatrix} \mathbf y_1 \\ \vdots \\ \mathbf y_m \end{pmatrix},$$
where each $V_i$ is an $n_i \times n$ submatrix and each $\mathbf y_i$ is an $n_i \times 1$ subvector. The components of $V_i$ and $\mathbf y_i$ are given by:
$$\begin{array}{ll}
(V_i)_{j,k} &= \begin{cases}
\displaystyle (j-1)! \binom{k-1}{j-1} x_i^{k-j} & \text{if } k \ge j, \\
0 & \text{otherwise}, \end{cases} \\
(\mathbf y_i)_j &= y_{i,j-1}.
\end{array}$$

In the monomial basis, the $n \times 1$ coefficient vector $\textstyle \mathbf a = (\begin{smallmatrix} a_1 & \cdots & a_n \end{smallmatrix})^T$ of the Hermite interpolating polynomial $\textstyle h(x) = \sum_{k=1}^n a_k x^{k-1}$ can be computed as:
$$\mathbf a = V^{-1} \mathbf y.$$

In numerical practice, directly computing $\textstyle V^{-1}$ is generally avoided because confluent Vandermonde matrices are notoriously ill-conditioned. As the number of nodes or their degree increases, their condition number grows exponentially, making direct matrix inversion numerically unstable and highly sensitive to floating-point errors; where exactness is required, these errors can be circumvented by converting floating-point values into exact rational numbers and performing the inversion in exact rational arithmetic.

=== Basis polynomials via linear algebra ===
Decomposing $\textstyle V^{-1}$ as:
$$V^{-1} = \begin{pmatrix} H_1 & \cdots & H_m \end{pmatrix},$$
where each $H_i$ is an $n \times n_i$ submatrix, the basis polynomials $h_{i,j}$ can be constructed directly from $H_i$:
$$h_{i,j}(x) = \sum_{k=1}^n (H_i)_{k,j+1} x^{k-1}.$$

== Hermite's contour integral ==
An elegant representation and derivation of the Hermite interpolating polynomial can be obtained using contour integration in the complex plane, a formulation originally introduced by Charles Hermite in 1878.

Suppose the target function $f$ is given and analytic on a simply connected domain $\Omega \subset \C$ containing the distinct nodes $x_1, \dots, x_m$. For any evaluation point $z \in \Omega$, let $\Gamma$ be a positively oriented, simple closed contour in $\Omega$ enclosing these nodes and $z$. The Hermite interpolating polynomial $h$ of degree less than $n$ can be expressed as
$$h(z) = f(z) - \frac{q(z)}{2\pi i} \oint_{\Gamma} \frac{f(\zeta)}{q(\zeta)(\zeta-z)} \, d\zeta.$$

Alternatively, by expressing $f$ via Cauchy's integral formula as
$$f(z) = \frac{1}{2\pi i} \oint_{\Gamma} \frac{f(\zeta)}{\zeta-z} \, d\zeta$$
and absorbing it into the integral, $h$ can be written equivalently as
$$h(z) = \frac{1}{2\pi i} \oint_{\Gamma} \frac{f(\zeta)\left(q(\zeta)-q(z)\right)}{q(\zeta)(\zeta-z)} \, d\zeta.$$

A key significance of Hermite's contour integral is that it provides an exact formula for the interpolation error $f - h$ (see also § Error function), given directly by the integral:
$$f(z) - h(z) = \frac{q(z)}{2\pi i} \oint_{\Gamma} \frac{f(\zeta)}{q(\zeta)(\zeta-z)} \, d\zeta.$$

It also proves that the target function $f$ can be decomposed as $f = p q + h$ such that the remainder $h = f \bmod{q}$ is the unique Hermite interpolating polynomial:
$$f(z) = \underbrace{\left[ \frac{1}{2\pi i} \oint_{\Gamma} \frac{f(\zeta)}{q(\zeta)(\zeta-z)} \, d\zeta \right]}_{p(z)} q(z) + \underbrace{\frac{1}{2\pi i} \oint_{\Gamma} \frac{f(\zeta)\left(q(\zeta)-q(z)\right)}{q(\zeta)(\zeta-z)} \, d\zeta}_{h(z)}.$$

=== Derivation using residues ===
Consider the meromorphic function
$$F(\zeta;z) = \frac{f(\zeta)}{q(\zeta)(\zeta-z)}.$$

Assuming $z$ is not one of the nodes $x_i$, $F$ has the following poles inside $\Gamma$:

- A simple pole at $z$.
- Poles at $x_i$ with order $n_i$ for each $i = 1, \dots, m$.

By the residue theorem, integrating $F$ along $\Gamma$ yields
$$\frac{1}{2\pi i} \oint_{\Gamma} \frac{f(\zeta)}{q(\zeta)(\zeta-z)} \, d\zeta = \operatorname{Res}_{\zeta=z} F(\zeta;z) + \sum_{i=1}^m \operatorname{Res}_{\zeta=x_i} F(\zeta;z).$$

The residue at the simple pole $z$ is easily evaluated as
$$\operatorname{Res}_{\zeta=z} F(\zeta;z) = \lim_{\zeta \to z} \, (\zeta - z) \frac{f(\zeta)}{q(\zeta)(\zeta-z)} = \frac{f(z)}{q(z)}.$$

Substituting this residue back into the integral equation gives
$$\frac{1}{2\pi i} \oint_{\Gamma} \frac{f(\zeta)}{q(\zeta)(\zeta-z)} \, d\zeta = \frac{f(z)}{q(z)} + \sum_{i=1}^m \operatorname{Res}_{\zeta=x_i} F(\zeta;z).$$

Rearranging terms to isolate $f(z)$ gives
$$f(z) = \frac{q(z)}{2\pi i} \oint_{\Gamma} \frac{f(\zeta)}{q(\zeta)(\zeta-z)} \, d\zeta - q(z) \sum_{i=1}^m \operatorname{Res}_{\zeta=x_i} F(\zeta;z).$$

Each residue $\operatorname{Res}_{\zeta=x_i} F(\zeta;z)$ is a rational function in $z$ with numerator degree $n_i-1$ and denominator degree $n_i$, whose denominator factors are cancelled out by $q(z)$. Summing these terms yields a polynomial in $z$ of degree less than $n$ that satisfies all interpolation conditions. Thus, it corresponds precisely to the Hermite interpolating polynomial $h$:
$$h(z) = -q(z) \sum_{i=1}^m \operatorname{Res}_{\zeta=x_i} F(\zeta;z).$$
Substituting this definition into the expression for $f(z)$ above and rearranging yields
$$h(z) = f(z) - \frac{q(z)}{2\pi i} \oint_{\Gamma} \frac{f(\zeta)}{q(\zeta)(\zeta-z)} \, d\zeta.$$

== Orthogonal projection method ==
The Hermite interpolating polynomial can also be constructed via an orthogonal projection onto the space of polynomials of degree less than $n$. By defining a suitable inner product based on the nodes and their derivative values, an orthogonal polynomial basis can be generated, allowing the interpolant to be expressed as a series of orthogonal projections.

We define an inner product on this polynomial space by:
$$\langle a, b \rangle = \sum_{i=1}^m \sum_{j=0}^{r_i} a^{(j)}(x_i) b^{(j)}(x_i),$$
with $\textstyle \lVert a \rVert = \sqrt{\langle a, a \rangle}$ denoting the induced norm.

An orthogonal basis $\textstyle \{h_k\}_{k=1}^n$ for the polynomial space can be constructed using the Gram-Schmidt process. Starting with $h_1(x) = 1$, subsequent basis polynomials are constructed recursively for $k = 1, \dots, n-1$ by:
$$h_{k+1}(x) = x h_k(x) - \sum_{l=1}^k \frac{\langle x h_k(x), h_l \rangle}{\phantom{^2} \lVert h_l \rVert^2} h_l(x)$$

The Hermite interpolating polynomial $h$ is given by the orthogonal projection of the target function $f$ onto the basis:
$$h(x) = \sum_{k=1}^n \frac{\langle f, h_k \rangle}{\phantom{^2} \lVert h_k \rVert^2} h_k(x),$$
or using the normalized orthonormal basis polynomials $\textstyle \hat{h}_k = h_k / \lVert h_k \rVert$,
$$h(x) = \sum_{k=1}^n \langle f, \hat{h}_k \rangle \hat{h}_k(x).$$

If only the derivative values $y_{i,j}$ are given instead of an explicit target function $f$, the inner product terms $\langle f, g \rangle$ can be evaluated directly using $\textstyle y_{i,j} = f^{(j)}(x_i)$ via:
$$\langle f, g \rangle = \sum_{i=1}^m \sum_{j=0}^{r_i} y_{i,j} g^{(j)}(x_i)$$

== Barycentric form ==
Barycentric Hermite interpolation is a formulation allowing for the updating of the resulting Hermite interpolating polynomial, such as adding new interpolation nodes or increasing the derivative degree at existing nodes, without having to reconstruct the entire polynomial from scratch.

The first barycentric form is given by:
$$h(x) = \sum_{i=1}^m \sum_{j=0}^{r_i} w_{i,j} \, q(x) \sum_{k=0}^{r_i-j} \frac{y_{i,k}}{k!} (x - x_i)^{(j+k) - n_i}$$
where $w_{i,j}$ for $i = 1,\dots,m$ and $j = 0,\dots,r_i$ are the barycentric weights to be determined. The barycentric form can be viewed as a linear combination whose coefficients are given by the barycentric weights. Solving the first barycentric form for the derivative values $y_{i,j} = \delta_{j,0}$, where $\delta_{a,b}$ is the Kronecker delta, yields the unique polynomial $g(x) = 1$; dividing the first barycentric form by $g$ yields the second barycentric form:
$$h(x) = \sum_{i=1}^m \sum_{j=0}^{r_i} w_{i,j} \frac{\textstyle \sum_{k=0}^{r_i-j} \frac{y_{i,k}}{k!} (x - x_i)^{(j+k) - n_i}}{\textstyle \sum_{k=1}^m \sum_{l=0}^{r_k} w_{k,l} (x - x_k)^{l - n_k}}.$$
Note that the factor $q$ is cancelled out in the second barycentric form, which improves numerical stability compared to the first barycentric form. For evaluation points $x$ which are close to one of the nodes $x_i$, catastrophic cancellation would ordinarily be a problem for the value $(x-x_i)$; however, this quantity appears in both numerator and denominator and they cancel out, leaving good relative accuracy in the final result. Using this formula to evaluate $h$ at one of the nodes $x_i$ will result in the indeterminate $\textstyle \sum_{j=0}^{r_i} \infty y_{i,j}/\infty$; computer implementations must replace such results by the local Taylor polynomial $\textstyle h(x_i) = g_i(x_i)$.

There are several ways to determine the barycentric weights $w_{i,j}$. One approach is to solve:
$$\mathcal{T}_{x_i}^{r_i} \!\left[ \frac{1}{q_i} \right]\!(x) = \sum_{j=0}^{r_i} w_{i,j} (x - x_i)^j \implies w_{i,j} = \frac{(1/q_i)^{(j)}(x_i)}{j!}$$
where $\textstyle \mathcal{T}_{a}^{k} [f]$ denotes the $k$th degree Taylor operator of a function $f$ centered at $a$. Another approach is to use the partial fraction decomposition:
$$\frac{1}{q(x)} = \sum_{i=1}^m \sum_{j=0}^{r_i} \frac{w_{i,j}}{(x - x_i)^{n_i - j}}.$$

=== Incremental updates for new nodes and higher derivative orders ===
There exists an algorithm with $O(n)$ space complexity and $O(n)$ time complexity for adding new nodes or adding higher derivative orders to existing nodes. For initial distinct nodes and derivative values, with $\mathcal{I}_{i,0} = 1$, the initial intermediate data and barycentric weights are constructed as follows:
$$\begin{array}{lll}
C_i &= \textstyle \prod_{j \neq i} (x_i - x_j)^{-n_j} & \text{for } i = 1,\dots,m \\
\mathcal{P}_{i,j} &= \textstyle \sum_{k \neq i} n_k (x_k - x_i)^{-j} & \text{for } i = 1,\dots,m \text{ and } j = 1,\dots,r_i \\
\mathcal{I}_{i,j} &= \textstyle \frac{1}{j} \sum_{k=1}^{j} \mathcal{P}_{i,k} \mathcal{I}_{i,j-k} & \text{for } i = 1,\dots,m \text{ and } j = 1,\dots,r_i \\
w_{i,j} &= C_i \mathcal{I}_{i,j} & \text{for } i = 1,\dots,m \text{ and } j = 0,\dots,r_i
\end{array}$$

When either a new distinct node is added at $\xi$ or a higher derivative order is added at $\xi = x_k$ for some $1 \le k \le m$, with $\textstyle \mathcal{I}'_{i,0} = \mathcal{I}_{i,0}$ and taking $w'_{i,-1} = 0$, the intermediate data and barycentric weights at existing distinct nodes $x_i \neq \xi$, omitting $x_k$ when $\xi = x_k$, are updated according to:
$$\begin{array}{lll}
C'_i &= C_i / (x_i - \xi) \\
\mathcal{P}'_{i,j} &= \mathcal{P}_{i,j} + (\xi - x_i)^{-j} & \text{for } j = 1,\dots,r_i \\
\mathcal{I}'_{i,j} &= \mathcal{I}_{i,j} + \mathcal{I}'_{i,j-1} / (\xi - x_i) & \text{for } j = 1,\dots,r_i \\
w'_{i,j} &= (w_{i,j} - w'_{i,j-1}) / (x_i - \xi) & \text{for } j = 0,\dots,r_i
\end{array}$$

In the case of adding a new distinct node at $x_{m+1} = \xi$, noting that there is no $\mathcal{P}_{m+1,0}$ and that $\mathcal{I}_{i,0} = 1$ for $i = m+1$, the remaining new intermediate data and barycentric weight follow the initial construction rules, which are given by:
$$\begin{array}{ll}
C_{m+1} &= \textstyle \prod_{i=1}^m (\xi - x_i)^{-n_i} \\
w_{m+1,0} &= C_{m+1} \mathcal{I}_{m+1,0} = C_{m+1}
\end{array}$$

In the case of adding a new derivative order at an existing distinct node $x_i = \xi$, existing intermediate data and barycentric weights at node $x_i$ do not require updating, and the new intermediate data and barycentric weight corresponding to the new derivative order $r_i+1$ follow the initial construction rules, which are given by:
$$\begin{array}{ll}
\mathcal{P}_{i,r_i+1} &= \textstyle \sum_{k \neq i} n_k (x_k - x_i)^{-(r_i+1)} \\
\mathcal{I}_{i,r_i+1} &= \textstyle \frac{1}{r_i+1} \sum_{k=1}^{r_i+1} \mathcal{P}_{i,k} \mathcal{I}_{i,(r_i+1)-k} \\
w_{i,r_i+1} &= C_i \mathcal{I}_{i,r_i+1}
\end{array}$$

The updated Hermite interpolating polynomial $h$ can be constructed using the updated variables by applying either the first barycentric form with an updated $q'(x) = q(x) (x - \xi)$ or the second barycentric form directly.

=== Basis polynomials in barycentric form ===
The barycentric forms can also be represented as a linear combination of Hermite basis polynomials $h_{i,j}$.

In the first barycentric form:
$$h_{i,j}(x) = \frac{q(x)}{j!} \sum_{k=0}^{r_i-j} w_{i,k} (x - x_i)^{(j+k) - n_i}$$
In the second barycentric form:
$$h_{i,j}(x) = \frac{1}{j!} \frac{\textstyle \sum_{k=0}^{r_i-j} w_{i,k} (x - x_i)^{(j+k) - n_i}}{\textstyle \sum_{k=1}^m \sum_{l=0}^{r_k} w_{k,l} (x - x_k)^{l - n_k}}.$$

== Properties ==
=== Properties as a linear operator ===
Hermite interpolation can be viewed as a linear operator denoted as $\mathcal{H}_X$, where $X = \{ x_1^{n_1}, \dots, x_m^{n_m} \}$ is a multiset consisting of each distinct node $x_i$ repeated $n_i$ times. The notation $\textstyle h = \mathcal{H}_X[f]$ denotes the computation of the Hermite interpolating polynomial $h$ for a target function $f$. The linear operator $\mathcal{H}_X$ satisfies the following properties:

- As a consequence of being able to express Hermite interpolation as a linear combination of basis polynomials $h_{i,j}$, for target functions $f_1$ and $f_2$ and scalars $\alpha$ and $\beta$, $\mathcal{H}_X$ satisfies linearity:

$$\textstyle \mathcal{H}_X[\alpha f_1 + \beta f_2] = \alpha \mathcal{H}_X[f_1] + \beta \mathcal{H}_X[f_2]$$

- Since each interpolation condition depends only on its own distinct node and multiplicity rather than the ordering of the distinct nodes, reordering the distinct nodes yields the same set of interpolation conditions. By the asserted uniqueness of Hermite interpolating polynomials, $\mathcal{H}_X$ is invariant under permutations of node-multiplicity pairs; consequently, given a permutation $\sigma$ of the index set $\{1,\dots,m\}$, the operator yields the same unique Hermite interpolating polynomial for a given target function:

$$\textstyle \mathcal{H}_{\{x_1^{n_1},\dots,x_m^{n_m}\}} = \mathcal{H}_{\{x_{\sigma(1)}^{n_{\sigma(1)} },\dots,x_{\sigma(m)}^{n_{\sigma(m)} }\}}$$

- As a consequence of the Chinese remainder theorem formulation of Hermite interpolation, and further proven in § Hermite's contour integral, when the target function $f$ is given and analytic on a simply connected domain $\Omega \subset \C$ containing all distinct nodes $x_1,\dots,x_m$, the unique Hermite interpolating polynomial satisfies the reduction:

$$\textstyle \mathcal{H}_X[f](z) = (f \bmod{q})(z) \quad \forall z \in \Omega$$

- For a target function $p \in P$, where $P$ denotes the space of polynomials of arbitrary finite degree, the unique Hermite interpolating polynomial is the polynomial reduction:

$$\textstyle \mathcal{H}_X[p] = p \bmod{q} \quad \forall p \in P$$

- As a consequence of the asserted uniqueness of Hermite interpolating polynomials, for a target function $p \in P_{n-1}$, where $P_{n-1}$ denotes the space of polynomials of degree less than $n$, the unique Hermite interpolating polynomial is $p$ itself:

$$\textstyle \mathcal{H}_X[p] = p \quad \forall p \in P_{n-1}$$

- As a consequence of the asserted uniqueness of Hermite interpolating polynomials, $\mathcal{H}_X$ is idempotent and acts as a projection:

$$\textstyle \mathcal{H}_X^2 = \mathcal{H}_X$$

- Hermite interpolation as a linear operator generalizes the Taylor operator (see § Reduction to Taylor polynomial interpolation):

$$\textstyle \mathcal{H}_{\{a^k\}} = \mathcal{T}_{a}^k$$

=== Properties of basis polynomials ===
The basis polynomials satisfy the following properties:

- The degree-0 basis polynomials sum to $1$ as a unique polynomial:

$$\textstyle \sum_{i=1}^m h_{i,0} = 1$$

- The degree-0 basis polynomials are idempotent modulo $q$:

$${\textstyle h_{i,0}^2 \equiv h_{i,0}} \pmod{q}$$

- The degree-0 basis polynomials are mutually orthogonal modulo $q$:

$${\textstyle h_{i,0} h_{j,0} \equiv 0} \pmod{q} \quad \text{for } i \neq j$$

- Higher-degree basis polynomials satisfy the congruence relation with degree-0 basis polynomials:

$${\textstyle \frac{1}{j!} (x-x_i)^j h_{i,0}(x) \equiv h_{i,j}(x)} \pmod{q(x)} \quad \text{for } j = 0,\dots,r_i$$

- Each basis polynomial $h_{i,j}$ can be regarded not only as a function of $x$ but also explicitly as a function of the remaining distinct nodes $x_1,\dots,x_{i-1},x_{i+1},\dots,x_m$, independent of $x_i$. For any permutation $\sigma$ of the index set $\{1,\dots,m\}$ that preserves node multiplicities such that $\textstyle n_l = n_{\sigma(l)}$ for all indices, if $\sigma$ maps index $i$ to index $k$ with $n_i = n_k$, then as a consequence of the asserted uniqueness of Hermite interpolating polynomials, the permutation yields the same set of interpolation conditions and the same unique polynomial. Thus, the basis polynomials satisfy the following relation under variable renaming:

$$\textstyle h_{i,j}(x; x_1, \dots, x_{i-1}, x_{i+1}, \dots, x_m) = h_{k,j}(x; x_{\sigma(1)}, \dots, x_{\sigma(i-1)}, x_{\sigma(i+1)}, \dots, x_{\sigma(m)}) \quad \forall \sigma \text{ s.t. } \sigma(i) = k \text{ and } n_l = n_{\sigma(l)} \ (\forall l)$$

== Finite fields ==
The Hermite interpolating polynomial can also be computed in finite fields. This has applications in coding theory and cryptography, such as in multiplicity codes.

Methods formulated for fields of characteristic zero can often be reformulated to work in positive characteristic fields, such as finite fields. The main hurdle is that $j!$ can become zero in positive characteristic; thus, the common factor $1/j!$ leads to division by zero and must be avoided. However, this factor is not always explicitly apparent in expressions involving standard derivatives, and isolating it can require deliberate algebraic effort. If $j$th order derivatives along with their $1/j!$ scaling factor can be replaced by $j$th order Hasse derivatives $\textstyle D^{(j)}$ in the characteristic zero formulation:
$$\frac{d^j/dx^j}{j!} \mapsto D^{(j)},$$
then the new formulation will also be valid in positive characteristic, given that Hasse derivatives are well-defined across arbitrary characteristics. Interpolation conditions are then expressed in terms of $\hat{y}_{i,j}$ instead of $y_{i,j}$:
$$\begin{array}{lll} \frac{h^{(j)}(x_i)}{j!} = \frac{y_{i,j}}{j!} & \mapsto & D^{(j)}[h](x_i) = \hat{y}_{i,j}, \end{array}$$
where $\hat{y}_{i,j}$ are either given or sampled from a given function $f$:
$$\begin{array}{lll} \frac{f^{(j)}(x_i)}{j!} = \frac{y_{i,j}}{j!} & \mapsto & D^{(j)}[f](x_i) = \hat{y}_{i,j}, \end{array}$$
and other expressions must similarly be reformulated in terms of $\hat{y}_{i,j}$, for example:
$$\begin{array}{lll}
g_i(x) = \sum_{j=0}^{r_i} \frac{y_{i,j}}{j!} (x-x_i)^j & \mapsto & g_i(x) = \sum_{j=0}^{r_i} \hat{y}_{i,j} (x-x_i)^j, \text{ and} \\
h = \sum \frac{y_{i,j}}{j!} j! h_{i,j} & \mapsto & h = \sum \hat{y}_{i,j} \hat{h}_{i,j}.
\end{array}$$

Below are several methods that work in positive characteristic fields after reformulation:

- § Explicit Taylor expansion formula
- § Explicit congruence formula
- § Chinese remainder theorem approach
- § Newton's divided difference method
- § Linear algebra approach
- § Orthogonal projection method with alternative inner product:

$$\textstyle \langle a, b \rangle = \sum_{i=1}^m \sum_{j=0}^{r_i} D^{(j)}[a](x_i) D^{(j)}[b](x_i)$$

- § Barycentric form

== Multivariate cases ==
Multivariate Hermite interpolation is a form of multivariate interpolation that extends Hermite interpolation to multivariate functions, which are functions of multiple variables. When there are $d$ function variables, it is also known as $d$-variate Hermite interpolation. It matches specified partial derivative values and function values, either given directly or sampled from a given target multivariate function, at given nodes. It also gives higher-dimensional cases of Hermite interpolation when the function variables are spatial coordinates of higher dimensions.

=== Grids of nodes ===
For $d$-variate Hermite interpolation over a non-equally spaced rectilinear grid of nodes, we require notation specific to this subsection that differs from § Notation and setup. Viewing the grid of nodes as a tensor product of $d$ standard Hermite interpolation problems along each axis, let $\mathbf x = (x_1,\dots,x_d)$ be the $d$D evaluation point vector, $m_k$ be the number of distinct $1$D nodes on the $k$th axis for $k = 1,\dots,d$, $I_k = \{ 1,\dots,m_k \}$ be the index set for indexing the distinct $1$D nodes on the $k$th axis, the Cartesian product $\textstyle I = I_1 \times \dots \times I_d$ be the set of multi-indices for indexing the distinct $d$D nodes of the tensor-product grid, and $\mathbf i = (i_1,\dots,i_d) \in I$ denote one of these $d$D multi-index elements. Let $x_{k,1},\dots,x_{k,m_k}$ be the given set of distinct $1$D nodes on the $k$th axis in any field of characteristic zero for $k = 1,\dots,d$, with associated maximum derivative orders $r_{k,i}$ and associated multiplicities $n_{k,i}$ satisfying $n_{k,i} = r_{k,i} + 1$ for each node. Let $\textstyle n_k = \sum_{i=1}^{m_k} n_{k,i}$ for $k = 1,\dots,d$ and $\textstyle n = 1 + \sum_{k=1}^d (n_k-1)$ be the polynomial degree bounds, and $\textstyle N = \prod_{k=1}^d n_k$ be the total number of interpolation conditions. Let $\mathbf x_{\mathbf i} = (x_{1,i_1},\dots,x_{d,i_d})$ and $\mathbf r_{\mathbf i} = (r_{1,i_1},\dots,r_{d,i_d})$ denote the $d$D node indexed by $\mathbf i$ and its associated maximum derivative orders, in $d$D vector form, respectively.

In the set of $d$D non-negative integer vectors $\N_0^d$, define the partial ordering by $\mathbf a \ge \mathbf b$ if and only if $a_k \ge b_k$ for every $k = 1,\dots,d$, making $\N_0^d$ a poset. Let $\mathbf 0$ denote the zero vector and $[\mathbf a, \mathbf b] = \left\{ \mathbf j \in \N_0^d \,\vert\, \mathbf a \ge \mathbf j \ge \mathbf b \right\}$ denote the set of all $d$D vectors in the closed interval between $\mathbf a$ and $\mathbf b$. Define the partial derivative operators $\textstyle \partial^{\mathbf j} = \prod_{k=1}^d \partial_{x_k}^{j_k}$ for $\mathbf j \in \N_0^d$. The $d$-variate Hermite interpolating polynomial $h$ is the unique polynomial of total degree less than $n$ that satisfies the $N$ interpolation conditions:
$$\left. \partial^{\mathbf j} h(\mathbf x) \right|_{\mathbf x = \mathbf x_{\mathbf i}} = y_{\mathbf i, \mathbf j} \quad \text{for } \mathbf i \in I \text{ and } \mathbf j \in [\mathbf 0, \mathbf r_{\mathbf i}],$$
where the specified partial derivative values $y_{\mathbf i, \mathbf j}$, with the 0th derivative values $y_{\mathbf i, \mathbf 0}$ being the function values, are in the same field as the $x_{k,i}$. The specified derivative values $y_{\mathbf i, \mathbf j}$ are either given or sampled from a given target $d$-variate function $f$ such that $\textstyle \partial^{\mathbf j} f(\mathbf x) \vert_{\mathbf x = \mathbf x_{\mathbf i} } = y_{\mathbf i, \mathbf j}$.

For each axis $k = 1,\dots,d$, the unique univariate Hermite interpolating basis polynomials $h_{k,i,j}$ for $i = 1,\dots,m_k$ and $j = 0,\dots,r_{k,i}$ of degree less than $n_k$ are first obtained from a standard Hermite interpolation problem on the distinct nodes $x_{k,1},\dots,x_{k,m_k}$ with associated multiplicities $n_{k,1},\dots,n_{k,m_k}$. Finally, the resulting $d$-variate Hermite interpolating polynomial $h$ is constructed from the tensor product of these univariate basis polynomials across all axes, given by:
$$h(\mathbf x) = \sum_{\mathbf i \in I} \sum_{\mathbf j \in [\mathbf 0, \mathbf r_{\mathbf i}]} y_{\mathbf i, \mathbf j} \prod_{k=1}^d h_{k,i_k,j_k}(x_k).$$
The dimension of the space of all possible interpolating polynomials $h$ as $y_{\mathbf i, \mathbf j}$ vary equals the number of interpolation conditions $N$, which is usually less than, though it can equal, the dimension of the space of all $d$-variate polynomials of total degree less than $n$, namely $\textstyle \binom{(n-1)+d}{d}$.

This method requires mixed higher-order partial derivatives beyond the individual maximum derivative orders $r_{k,i}$ given for each distinct $1$D node along each axis. For example, when $d = 2$ and $r_{k,i} = 1$ for all $k$ and $i$, the second-order mixed partial derivative operator $\partial_{x_1} \partial_{x_2}$ appears in the formulation alongside the first-order operators $\partial_{x_1}, \partial_{x_2}$. Note that the other second-order partial derivative operators $\partial_{x_1}^2,\partial_{x_2}^2$ do not appear.

== Common low-degree cases ==
=== Cubic Hermite spline ===
Cubic Hermite splines are widely used in numerical analysis, computer graphics, and motion planning for keyframe animation, path trajectories, and geometric modeling because they ensure smooth $\textstyle C^1$ continuity while providing precise local control over both endpoint positions and tangents.

On the unit interval $x \in [0, 1]$, the two endpoints are defined as $x_1 = 0$ and $x_2 = 1$, the cubic Hermite interpolant $h$ is uniquely determined by boundary values and first derivatives $f(0), f(1), f'(0), f'(1)$:
$$h(x) = f(0) h_{1,0}(x) + f'(0) h_{1,1}(x) + f(1) h_{2,0}(x) + f'(1) h_{2,1}(x),$$
where the four basis polynomials are:
$$\begin{aligned}
h_{1,0}(x) &= 2x^3 - 3x^2 + 1, \\
h_{1,1}(x) &= x^3 - 2x^2 + x, \\
h_{2,0}(x) &= -2x^3 + 3x^2, \\
h_{2,1}(x) &= x^3 - x^2.
\end{aligned}$$

For rescaling to arbitrary intervals, piecewise multi-interval construction, or extension to 2D/3D parametric curves, see Cubic Hermite spline.

=== Quintic Hermite interpolation ===
The quintic Hermite interpolation based on the function $f$, its first $f'$ and second derivatives $f''$ at two different points ($x_1$ and $x_2$) can be used for example to interpolate the position of an object based on its position, velocity and acceleration. The general form of the resulting quintic polynomial $h$ is given by
$$h(x) = f(x_1) h_{1,0}(x) + f'(x_1) h_{1,1}(x) + f''(x_1) h_{1,2}(x) + f(x_2) h_{2,0}(x) + f'(x_2) h_{2,1}(x) + f''(x_2) h_{2,2}(x),$$
where $\textstyle h_{i,j}(x) = \hat{h}_{i,j}(\frac{x-x_1}{x_2-x_1})$ and $\textstyle \hat{h}_{i,j}$ are the six simplified basis polynomials for the case $x_1=0$ and $x_2=1$, given by:
$$\begin{aligned}
\hat{h}_{1,0}(x) &= (-6x^2 -3x -1) (x-1)^3, \\
\hat{h}_{1,1}(x) &= (-3x^2 -x) (x-1)^3,\\
\hat{h}_{1,2}(x) &= {\textstyle -\frac{1}{2}} x^2 (x-1)^3, \\
\hat{h}_{2,0}(x) &= \bigl( 6(x-1)^2 -3x +4 \bigr) x^3, \\
\hat{h}_{2,1}(x) &= \bigl( {-3}(x-1)^2 +x -1 \bigr) x^3, \\
\hat{h}_{2,2}(x) &= {\textstyle \frac{1}{2}} (x-1)^2 x^3.
\end{aligned}$$

== Basis polynomials ==
Each basis polynomial $h_{i,j}$ is uniquely defined as the interpolating polynomial of degree less than $n$ satisfying the interpolation conditions given by the Kronecker delta:
$$h_{i,j}^{(l)}(x_k) = \delta_{i,k} \delta_{j,l} = \begin{cases} 1 & \text{if } k = i \text{ and } l = j, \\ 0 & \text{otherwise.} \end{cases}$$

To construct a specific basis polynomial $h_{i, j}$, one can apply any general method for solving Hermite interpolation using the corresponding derivative values prescribed by the Kronecker delta above. By passing these required derivative values as input into the selected interpolation method, the resulting unique polynomial is precisely $h_{i, j}$. Repeating this process for each pair of indices $(i, j)$ constructs the full set of $n$ basis polynomials.

Specialized methods for computing the basis include:

- § Basis polynomials via Taylor expansion
- § Explicit recursive formula
- § Explicit congruence formula
- § Basis polynomials via Chinese remainder theorem
- § Basis polynomials via linear algebra
- § Basis polynomials in barycentric form

The above basis is commonly known as the generalized Lagrange basis. Other notable common bases are the Newton basis of Newton's divided difference method (see here), the monomial basis of the confluent Vandermonde matrix (see here), and the orthogonal basis of the orthogonal projection method (see here). There is also the barycentric basis that expresses the Hermite interpolating polynomial in terms of barycentric weights (see here).

=== Alternative basis construction via degree-0 basis polynomials ===
Once the degree-0 basis polynomials $h_{i,0}$ are obtained, the Hermite interpolation polynomial $h$ can be constructed directly via polynomial reduction:
$$h(x) = \sum_{i=1}^m \underbrace{\left[ \sum_{j=0}^{r_i} \frac{y_{i,j}}{j!} (x-x_i)^j \right]}_{g_i(x)} h_{i,0}(x) \bmod{q(x)}.$$
Taking the remainder modulo $q$ guarantees that $\deg(h) < \deg(q) = n$, projecting the polynomial into the subspace of degree less than $n$. Because $q$ vanishes at every node $x_i$ to order $n_i$, all interpolation conditions at the nodes are preserved under this modular reduction. This bounds the degree and ensures the constructed $h$ is the unique polynomial of degree less than $n$ satisfying its corresponding interpolation conditions.

As a result, the higher-degree derivative basis polynomials $h_{i,j}$ for $1 \le j \le r_i$ can be expressed directly via polynomial reduction:
$$h_{i,j}(x) = \frac{1}{j!} (x - x_i)^j h_{i,0}(x) \bmod{q(x)}.$$

This construction is particularly advantageous when direct evaluation of higher-degree basis polynomials $h_{i,j}$ is computationally expensive or numerically unstable. In some cases, the degree-0 basis polynomials $h_{i,0}$ are simply cleaner and easier to construct and compute, allowing all remaining higher-degree basis polynomials for that node to be generated efficiently through straightforward polynomial multiplication and polynomial reduction.

== Error ==
=== Error function ===
Suppose the target function $f$ is given. Consider first the real-valued case. Let $\textstyle a = \min_i x_i$ and $\textstyle b = \max_i x_i$. Evaluating at a point $x \in [a, b]$, the error function is
$$f(x) - h(x) = \frac{f^{(n)}(c)}{n!} \prod_{i=1}^m (x - x_i)^{n_i},$$
where $c$ is an unknown value within the range $[a, b]$, derived using a generalization of the mean value theorem for divided differences to confluent nodes. The degree of the product polynomial on the right is $n$, which is one higher than the degree bound $n - 1$ for $h$. Furthermore, the error and all its derivatives up to order $n_i - 1$ are zero at each node $x_i$, as expected.

In the complex case, when $f$ is analytic on a simply connected domain $\Omega \subset \C$ containing the distinct nodes $x_1, \dots, x_m$ and the evaluation point $z$, the error function is
$$f(z) - h(z) = \frac{q(z)}{2\pi i} \oint_{\Gamma} \frac{f(\zeta)}{q(\zeta)(\zeta-z)}d\zeta,$$
where $\Gamma$ is a positively oriented, simple closed contour in $\Omega$ enclosing these nodes and $z$.

=== Runge's phenomenon ===
Hermite interpolation at equally spaced nodes yields a polynomial oscillating above and below the true function. This behaviour tends to grow with the number of interpolation conditions, leading to a divergence known as Runge's phenomenon; the problem may be eliminated by choosing interpolation points at Chebyshev nodes or mock-Chebyshev nodes, which are a subset of the equally spaced nodes carefully selected to closely mimic the behavior of Chebyshev nodes.

== Relation to matrix theory ==
Hermite interpolation can be used to calculate matrix functions and generalized eigenspace projections.

For an $n \times n$ square matrix $A$ with distinct eigenvalues $\lambda_1, \dots, \lambda_m$, each with an algebraic multiplicity of $n_i$ such that $\textstyle n = \sum_{i=1}^m n_i$, a given scalar-valued, sufficiently differentiable function $f$ can be evaluated at $A$ as a matrix function. This is achieved by solving the Hermite interpolation problem with distinct nodes $x_i = \lambda_i$ for $i = 1,\dots,m$, and derivative values $\textstyle y_{i,j} = f^{(j)}(\lambda_i)$ for $i = 1,\dots,m$ and $j = 0,\dots,r_i$. After solving for the unique Hermite interpolating polynomial $h$ of degree less than $n$, $f(A)$ can be evaluated as the matrix polynomial
$$f(A) = h(A).$$

Alternatively, $f(A)$ can be expressed as the linear combination
$$f(A) = \sum_{i=1}^m \sum_{j=0}^{r_i} f^{(j)}(\lambda_i) h_{i,j}(A).$$

Note that the characteristic polynomial $p_A$ of $A$ satisfies $p_A = q$. Whereas the polynomials $h_{i,j}$ satisfy the polynomial reduction
$$h_{i,j}(\lambda) = {\textstyle \frac{1}{j!}} (\lambda-\lambda_i)^j h_{i,0}(\lambda) \bmod{q(\lambda)},$$
in contrast, by the Cayley–Hamilton theorem, matrix evaluation satisfies $p_A(A) = \mathbf 0$, which eliminates the polynomial reduction entirely:
$$h_{i,j}(A) = {\textstyle \frac{1}{j!}} (A - \lambda_i I)^j h_{i,0}(A).$$

Consider the case where $f$ is the identity function $f(x) = x$. Solving the Hermite interpolation problem in the linear combination form, with $h_{i,1}(A) = \mathbf 0$ when $r_i = 0$, expresses $A$ in terms of the basis polynomials $h_{i,j}$:
$$A = \sum_{i=1}^m \lambda_i h_{i,0}(A) + h_{i,1}(A).$$

In general, the generalized Frobenius covariants $F_i(A) = h_{i,0}(A)$ project $f(A)$ into the generalized eigenspace of the $i$th distinct eigenvalue $\lambda_i$ as
$$F_i(A) f(A) = f(A) F_i(A) = \sum_{j=0}^{r_i} f^{(j)}(\lambda_i) h_{i,j}(A).$$
They also frequently appear in various formulations of the generalized Sylvester's formula, which provides an alternative method for computing matrix functions.

== Generalization ==
=== Birkhoff interpolation ===
Birkhoff interpolation, also known as lacunary Hermite interpolation, is a generalization of Hermite interpolation. Both fit a polynomial to specified derivative values and function values, whether given directly or sampled from a given target function. However, Birkhoff interpolation allows the specified derivative values and function values to be lacunary, meaning that a higher-order derivative at a node may be specified without specifying the function value or some lower-order derivatives there.

=== Rational Hermite interpolation ===
While standard Hermite interpolation constructs a polynomial that matches interpolation conditions at given distinct nodes, rational Hermite interpolation seeks to satisfy the interpolation conditions with a rational function $a/b$:
$$(a/b)^{(j)}(x_i) = y_{i,j} \quad \text{for } i=1,\dots,m \text{ and } j=0,\dots,r_i,$$
where $\textstyle a(x) = \sum_{i=0}^{d_a} a_i x^i$ and $\textstyle b(x) = \sum_{i=0}^{d_b} b_i x^i$ satisfy $\deg(a) \le d_a$ and $\deg(b) \le d_b$, respectively. The case where $d_a + d_b = n - 1$ is referred to as the normal case, which admits a unique solution when one exists; the resulting unique rational function is commonly known as the rational Hermite interpolating function or the rational Hermite interpolant. This interpolation problem directly generalizes standard Hermite interpolation, reducing to the latter when $d_a = n - 1$ and $d_b = 0$. Moreover, just as standard Hermite interpolation generalizes polynomial interpolation and Taylor polynomial interpolation, rational Hermite interpolation further generalizes Cauchy interpolation and Padé approximation, respectively.

Various methods exist for solving the rational Hermite interpolation problem. One approach is to formulate the normal case as a linear algebra problem by considering the linearized interpolation conditions:
$$(g_i b - a)^{(j)}(x_i) = 0 \quad \text{for } i=1,\dots,m \text{ and } j=0,\dots,r_i,$$
which yields the following homogeneous system of linear equations:
$$M \mathbf v = \mathbf 0,$$
where $\mathbf v$ is an $(n + 1) \times 1$ vector given by:
$$\mathbf v = \begin{pmatrix} a_0 & \cdots & a_{d_a} & b_0 & \cdots & b_{d_b} \end{pmatrix}^T,$$
and $M$ is an $n \times (n+1)$ matrix given by:
$$M = \begin{pmatrix}A_1 & B_1 \\ \vdots & \vdots \\ A_m & B_m \end{pmatrix},$$
where each $A_i$ is an $n_i \times (d_a + 1)$ submatrix with entries
$$(A_i)_{j,k} = \begin{cases} \displaystyle -(j-1)! \binom{k-1}{j-1} x_i^{k-j} & \text{if } k \ge j, \\ 0 & \text{otherwise}, \end{cases}$$
and each $B_i$ is an $n_i \times (d_b + 1)$ submatrix with entries
$$(B_i)_{j,k} = \sum_{l=1}^{j} \begin{cases} \displaystyle (j-1)! \binom{k-1}{l-1} \frac{y_{i,j-l}}{(j-l)!} x_i^{k-l} & \text{if } k \ge l, \\ 0 & \text{otherwise}. \end{cases}$$

The solution vector $\mathbf v$ is a nontrivial vector in the nullspace of $M$ satisfying $\mathbf v \in \ker(M)$ and $\mathbf v \neq \mathbf 0$, and the polynomials $a$ and $b$ are constructed from its components. Any common factors between $a$ and $b$ are cancelled to remove any removable singularities. To ensure uniqueness of the rational function $a/b$, the polynomials $a$ and $b$ are further normalized by a common scalar factor such that either $b$ is monic or its lowest-degree nonzero coefficient is equal to one.

Although the constructed rational function $a/b$ satisfies all linearized interpolation conditions, it may not satisfy some of the original interpolation conditions due to the presence of poles or unattainable points at some distinct nodes $x_i$. An unattainable point is a distinct node $x_i$ that admits no rational function of the desired degree bounds satisfying the original interpolation conditions $\textstyle (a/b)^{(j)}(x_i) = y_{i,j}$ for $j = 0,\dots,r_i$ at $x_i$. It is therefore necessary to verify whether all original interpolation conditions are satisfied; otherwise, the constructed rational function $a/b$ is not a valid solution, indicating that no solution of the desired degree bounds $d_a$ and $d_b$ exists for the original problem.

== See also ==
- Newton series, also known as finite differences
- Neville's schema
- Bernstein polynomials
