= Frobenius covariant =

In matrix theory, the Frobenius covariants of a square matrix A are special polynomials of it, namely projection matrices F_{i}(A) associated with the eigenvalues and eigenvectors of A. They are named after the mathematician Ferdinand Frobenius.

Each covariant is a projection on the eigenspace associated with the eigenvalue λ_{i}. Frobenius covariants are the coefficients of Sylvester's formula, which expresses a function of a matrix f(A) as a matrix polynomial, namely a linear combination of that function's values on the eigenvalues of A.

== Formal definition ==
Let A be a diagonalizable matrix with eigenvalues λ_{1}, ..., λ_{k}.

The Frobenius covariant F_{i}(A), for i = 1,..., k, is the matrix
$$F_i (A) \equiv  \prod_{j=1 \atop j \ne i}^k \frac{1}{\lambda_i-\lambda_j} (A - \lambda_j I).$$

It is essentially the Lagrange polynomial with matrix argument; alternatively, the same unique polynomial can be constructed using Newton polynomial. If the eigenvalue λ_{i} is simple, then as an idempotent projection matrix to a one-dimensional subspace, F_{i}(A) has a unit trace.

Resolvent formalism can also be used to compute Frobenius covariants; see § Holomorphic matrix functional calculus.

== Computing the covariants ==
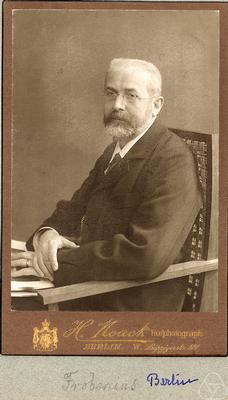
Ferdinand Georg Frobenius (1849–1917), German mathematician. His main interests were elliptic functions, differential equations, and later group theory.

The Frobenius covariants of a matrix A can be obtained from any eigendecomposition A = SDS^{−1}, where S is non-singular and D is diagonal with D_{i,i} = λ_{i}. The matrix S is defined up to multiplication on the right by a diagonal matrix. If A has no multiple eigenvalues, then let c_{i} be the ith right eigenvector of A, that is, the ith column of S; and let r_{i} be the ith left eigenvector of A, namely the ith row of S^{−1}. Then F_{i}(A) = c_{i} r_{i}. As a projection matrix, the Frobenius covariant satisfies the relation
$$F_i (A)F_j (A) =  \delta_{ij}F_i (A),$$
which leads to r_{i} c_{j} = δ_{ij}.

Given that v and w are the right and left vectors satisfying w F_{i}(A) v ≠ 0, the right and left eigenvectors of A may be written as c_{i} = N_{ci} F_{i}(A) v and r_{i} = N_{ri} w F_{i}(A). The orthonormality of the eigenvectors gives one constraint for the normalization coefficients. The remaining freedom is related to the choice of representation for the matrix S.

If A has an eigenvalue λ_{i} appearing multiple times, then F_{i}(A) = Σ_{j} c_{j} r_{j}, where the sum is over all rows and columns associated with the eigenvalue λ_{i}.

== Example ==
Consider the two-by-two matrix:
$$A = \begin{bmatrix} 1 & 3 \\ 4 & 2 \end{bmatrix}.$$
This matrix has two eigenvalues, 5 and −2, which can be found by solving the characteristic equation. By virtue of the Cayley–Hamilton theorem, (A − 5)(A + 2) = 0.

The corresponding eigendecomposition is
$$A = \begin{bmatrix} 3 & 1/7 \\ 4 & -1/7 \end{bmatrix} \begin{bmatrix} 5 & 0 \\ 0 & -2 \end{bmatrix} \begin{bmatrix} 3 & 1/7 \\ 4 & -1/7 \end{bmatrix}^{-1} = \begin{bmatrix} 3 & 1/7 \\ 4 & -1/7 \end{bmatrix} \begin{bmatrix} 5 & 0 \\ 0 & -2 \end{bmatrix} \begin{bmatrix} 1/7 & 1/7 \\ 4 & -3 \end{bmatrix}.$$
Hence the Frobenius covariants, manifestly projections, are
$$\begin{array}{rl}
F_1(A) &= c_1 r_1 = \begin{bmatrix} 3 \\ 4 \end{bmatrix} \begin{bmatrix} 1/7 & 1/7 \end{bmatrix} = \begin{bmatrix} 3/7 & 3/7 \\ 4/7 & 4/7 \end{bmatrix} = F_1^2(A)\\
F_2(A) &= c_2 r_2 = \begin{bmatrix} 1/7 \\ -1/7 \end{bmatrix} \begin{bmatrix} 4 & -3 \end{bmatrix} = \begin{bmatrix} 4/7 & -3/7 \\ -4/7 & 3/7 \end{bmatrix}=F_2^2(A) ~,
\end{array}$$
with
$$F_1(A) F_2(A) = 0 , \qquad F_1(A) + F_2(A) = I ~.$$
Note tr F_{1}(A) = tr F_{2} (A)= 1, as required.

== Generalization ==
When a square matrix $\textstyle A \in \C^{n \times n}$ has repeated eigenvalues (such as a defective matrix or a diagonalizable one), the standard definition of Frobenius covariants based on Lagrange polynomials becomes undefined due to division by zero.

In this general case, let $\lambda_1, \dots, \lambda_m$ be the distinct eigenvalues of $A$, each with an algebraic multiplicity of $n_i$ such that $\textstyle n = \sum_{i=1}^m n_i$. The generalized Frobenius covariants $F_i(A) \in \C^{n \times n}$ are projection matrices that project $\C^n$ onto the generalized eigenspace corresponding to $\lambda_i$ along the direct sum of the remaining generalized eigenspaces, satisfying $\textstyle \sum_{i=1}^m F_i(A) = I$. Similarly, generalized Frobenius covariants enable the generalized Sylvester's formula to compute matrix functions for any square matrix.

The generalized Frobenius covariants $F_i(A)$ can be constructed using several equivalent methods.

=== Construction via Hermite interpolation ===
To generalize the projection matrices for cases with repeated eigenvalues, one can use Hermite interpolating polynomials. The generalized Frobenius covariant $F_i(A)$ is evaluated by applying the polynomial to $A$ as a matrix polynomial:
$$F_i(A) = h_{i,0}(A),$$
where $h_{i,0}$ is the degree-0 Hermite interpolating basis polynomial for the 0th derivative corresponding to node $\lambda_i$, which is also the unique polynomial of degree less than $n$ satisfying the interpolation conditions:
$$h_{i,0}^{(j)}(\lambda_k) = \delta_{ik}\delta_{j0} \quad \text{for } k = 1,\dots,m \text{ and } j = 0,\dots,n_k-1,$$
where $\delta_{a b}$ denotes the Kronecker delta.

The degree-0 Hermite interpolating basis polynomial $h_{i,0}$ can be constructed using any standard Hermite interpolation method, such as Newton's divided difference method with confluent nodes, solving a confluent Vandermonde system or via the Chinese remainder theorem. For working over fields of positive characteristic, a reformulation of methods is required; see Hermite interpolation § Finite fields.

==== Closed-form explicit formula ====
Adapting the explicit formula for degree-0 Hermite interpolating basis polynomials (derived from an explicit formula via the Taylor composition theorem; see Hermite interpolation § Explicit Taylor expansion formula), which is given by:
$$h_{i,0}(\lambda) = \underbrace{\left[ \sum_{j=0}^{n_i - 1} \frac{(1/q_i)^{(j)}(\lambda_i)}{j!} (\lambda - \lambda_i)^j \right]}_{\mathcal{T}_{\lambda_i}^{n_i - 1} \left[ 1/q_i \right](\lambda)} q_i(\lambda),$$
where $\textstyle q_i(\lambda) = \prod_{j \neq i} (\lambda - \lambda_j)^{n_j}$ and $\textstyle \mathcal{T}_{a}^{k} [f]$ denotes the $k$th degree Taylor operator of a function $f$ centered at $a$. Evaluating this degree-0 Hermite interpolating basis polynomial $h_{i,0}$ at $A$ constructs the generalized Frobenius covariant $F_i(A) = h_{i,0}(A)$.

Another explicit formula requiring only basic algebraic operations and polynomial reduction is given by Bossoney and Troyanov (see Hermite interpolation § Explicit congruence formula):
$$h_{i,0}(\lambda) = \underbrace{\left[ 1 - \left( 1 - \frac{q_i(\lambda)}{q_i(\lambda_i)} \right)^{n_i} \right]}_{h_i(\lambda)} \bmod{p_A(\lambda)},$$
where $p_A$ is the characteristic polynomial of $A$. By the Cayley–Hamilton theorem, $p_A(A) = \mathbf 0$; thus, polynomial reduction is unnecessary when evaluating at $A$, yielding $F_i(A) = h_{i,0}(A) = h_i(A)$.

==== Relation to higher-degree Hermite interpolating basis polynomials ====
Let $h_{i,j}$ denote the degree-$j$ Hermite interpolating basis polynomial for the $j$th derivative corresponding to node $\lambda_i$ for $0 \le j < n_i$. In terms of the Jordan–Chevalley decomposition, applying a higher-degree basis polynomial $h_{i,j}$ to matrix $A$ isolates the scaled $j$th power $\textstyle N_i^j / j!$ corresponding to the nilpotent matrix $N_i = F_i(A) (A - \lambda_i I)$ associated with the Jordan blocks of $\lambda_i$ (which is not a projection matrix for $j > 0$). When $j = 0$, $\textstyle N_i^0 / 0!$ acts as the identity on that generalized eigenspace, reducing $h_{i,0}(A)$ to the projection matrix $F_i(A)$.

Let $\textstyle Z_{i,j} = N_i^j / j!$ and $f$ be any matrix function. These component matrices satisfy several identities:
$$\begin{array}{ll}
Z_{i,0} &= F_i(A) \\
Z_{i,j} &= h_{i,j}(A) \\
Z_{i,j} &= \textstyle (A - \lambda_i I)^j Z_{i,0} / j! \\
Z_{i,j} &= Z_{i,0} Z_{i,j} = Z_{i,j} Z_{i,0} \\
Z_{i,0} &= \textstyle Z_{i,0}^2 \\
\mathbf 0 &= Z_{i,j} Z_{k,l} \quad \text{for } i \neq k \\
\mathbf 0 &= Z_{i,j} Z_{k,l} - Z_{k,l} Z_{i,j} \\
\mathbf 0 &= Z_{i,j} A - A Z_{i,j} \\
\mathbf 0 &= Z_{i,j} f(A) - f(A) Z_{i,j} \\
I &= \textstyle \sum_{i=1}^m Z_{i,0} \\
A &= \textstyle \sum_{i=1}^m \lambda_i Z_{i,0} + Z_{i,1} \\
f(A) &= \textstyle \sum_{i=1}^m \sum_{j=0}^{n_i-1} f^{(j)}(\lambda_i) Z_{i,j}
\end{array}$$

=== Construction without Hermite interpolation ===
Besides constructing Hermite interpolating basis polynomials, the generalized Frobenius covariants $F_i(A)$ can also be constructed directly using several non-interpolation methods.

==== Jordan normal form ====
This approach generalizes the eigendecomposition method for distinct eigenvalues described in § Computing the covariants to arbitrary matrices with non-trivial Jordan blocks. If the Jordan normal form decomposition $\textstyle A = P J P^{-1}$ is known, $F_i(A)$ can be evaluated directly as $\textstyle F_i(A) = P E_i P^{-1}$, where $E_i$ is a block diagonal matrix whose blocks corresponding to $\lambda_i$ are identity matrices of matching dimensions, with all other entries set to zero.

==== Nullspace projection ====
Without finding Jordan chains, the generalized eigenspaces $\textstyle \mathcal{V}_i = \ker\bigl((A - \lambda_i I)^{n_i}\bigr)$ of dimension $n_i$ for $i = 1,\dots,m$ decompose the vector space into a direct sum $\textstyle \C^n = \mathcal{V}_1 \oplus \dots \oplus \mathcal{V}_m$, with $\textstyle \operatorname{im}\bigl(F_i(A)\bigr) = \mathcal{V}_i$ and $\textstyle \ker\bigl(F_i(A)\bigr) = \bigoplus_{j \neq i} \mathcal{V}_j$.

Let $\textstyle Q_i \in \C^{n \times n_i}$ be a matrix whose columns form a basis for $\mathcal{V}_i$. Assembling the partitioned basis matrix $\textstyle Q = (\begin{smallmatrix} Q_1 & \cdots & Q_m \end{smallmatrix})$ yields
$$F_i(A) = Q \operatorname{diag}( \mathbf 0_{n_1}, \ldots, \mathbf 0_{n_{i-1}}, I_{n_{i}}, \mathbf 0_{n_{i+1}}, \ldots, \mathbf 0_{n_m} ) \, Q^{-1}.$$
where $\mathbf 0_k$ denotes the $k \times k$ zero matrix and $I_k$ denotes the $k \times k$ identity matrix.

==== Holomorphic matrix functional calculus ====
Under the holomorphic matrix functional calculus, the generalized Frobenius covariant $F_i(A)$ can be defined directly without polynomial interpolation as a contour integral of the resolvent matrix $\textstyle (zI - A)^{-1}$:
$$F_i(A) = \frac{1}{2\pi i} \oint_{\Gamma_i} (zI - A)^{-1} \, dz,$$
where $\Gamma_i$ is a simple closed contour in the complex plane that encloses $\lambda_i$ in its interior while excluding all other eigenvalues of $A$.
