= Lagrange polynomial =

Polynomials used for interpolation

This image shows, for four data points ((−9, 5), (−4, 2), (−1, −2), (7, 9)), the (cubic) interpolation polynomial L(x) (dashed, black), which is the sum of the scaled basis polynomials y_{0}ℓ_{0}(x), y_{1}ℓ_{1}(x), y_{2}ℓ_{2}(x) and y_{3}ℓ_{3}(x). The interpolation polynomial passes through all four control points, and each scaled basis polynomial passes through its respective control point and is 0 where x corresponds to the other three control points.

In numerical analysis, the Lagrange interpolating polynomial is the unique polynomial of lowest degree that interpolates a given set of data.

Given a data set of coordinate pairs $\textstyle (x_j, y_j)$, the $\textstyle x_j$ are called nodes and the $\textstyle y_j$ are called values. The Lagrange polynomial $L(x)$ which interpolates the data assumes each value at the corresponding node, $\textstyle L(x_j) = y_j$. If there are $k+1$ data pairs, the Lagrange polynomial has degree $\leq k$.

Although named after Joseph-Louis Lagrange, who published it in 1795, the method was first discovered in 1779 by Edward Waring. It is also an easy consequence of a formula published in 1783 by Leonhard Euler.

Uses of Lagrange polynomials include the Newton–Cotes method of numerical integration, Shamir's secret sharing scheme in cryptography, and Reed–Solomon error correction in coding theory.

For equispaced nodes, Lagrange interpolation is susceptible to Runge's phenomenon of large oscillation.

In matrix theory, Lagrange polynomials are also related to the evaluation of matrix functions and eigenspace projection via Frobenius covariants.

== Definition ==
Given a set of $k + 1$ nodes $\{x_0, x_1, \ldots, x_k\}$, which must all be distinct, $\textstyle x_j \neq x_m$ for indices $j \neq m$, the Lagrange basis for polynomials of degree $\leq k$ for those nodes is the set of polynomials $\textstyle \{\ell_0(x), \ell_1(x), \ldots, \ell_k(x)\}$ each of degree $k$ which take values $\textstyle \ell_j(x_m) = 0$ if $m \neq j$ and $\textstyle \ell_j(x_j) = 1$. Using the Kronecker delta this can be written $\textstyle \ell_j(x_m) = \delta_{jm}$. Each basis polynomial can be explicitly described by the product:

$$\begin{aligned}
\ell_j(x) &= \frac{(x-x_0)}{(x_j-x_0)} \cdots \frac{(x-x_{j-1})}{(x_j-x_{j - 1})} \frac{(x-x_{j+1})}{(x_j-x_{j+1})} \cdots \frac{(x-x_k)}{(x_j-x_k)} \\[8mu]
&= \prod_{\begin{smallmatrix}0\le m\le k\\ m\neq j\end{smallmatrix}} \frac{x-x_m}{x_j-x_m} \vphantom\Bigg|.
\end{aligned}$$

Notice that the numerator $\textstyle \prod_{m \neq j}(x - x_m)$ has $k$ roots at the nodes $\textstyle \{x_m\}_{m \neq j}$ while the denominator $\textstyle \prod_{m \neq j}(x_j - x_m)$ scales the resulting polynomial so that $\textstyle \ell_j(x_j) = 1$.

The Lagrange interpolating polynomial for those nodes through the corresponding values $\{y_0, y_1, \ldots, y_k\}$ is the linear combination:

$$L(x) = \sum_{j=0}^{k} y_j \ell_j(x).$$

Each basis polynomial has degree $k$, so the sum $L(x)$ has degree $\leq k$, and it interpolates the data because $\textstyle L(x_m) = \sum_{j=0}^{k} y_j \ell_j(x_m) = \sum_{j=0}^{k} y_j \delta_{mj} = y_m$.

The interpolating polynomial is unique. Proof: assume some polynomial $M(x)$ of degree $\leq k$ interpolates the data. Then the difference $M(x) - L(x)$ is zero at $k + 1$ distinct nodes $\{x_0, x_1, \ldots, x_k\}$. But the only polynomial of degree $\leq k$ with more than $k$ roots is the constant zero function, so $M(x) - L(x) = 0$, or $M(x) = L(x)$.

The unique interpolating polynomial can alternatively be constructed using Newton polynomials as an alternative basis, or generalized to Hermite interpolating polynomials when there are confluent nodes.

== Barycentric form ==
Each Lagrange basis polynomial $\textstyle \ell_j(x)$ can be rewritten as the product of three parts, a function $\textstyle \ell(x) = \prod_m (x - x_m)$ common to every basis polynomial, a node-specific constant $\textstyle w_j = \prod_{m\neq j}(x_j - x_m)^{-1}$ (called the barycentric weight), and a part representing the displacement from $\textstyle x_j$ to $x$:

$$\ell_j(x) = \ell(x) \dfrac{w_j}{x - x_j}$$

By factoring $\ell(x)$ out from the sum, we can write the Lagrange polynomial in the so-called first barycentric form:

$$L(x) = \ell(x) \sum_{j=0}^k \frac{w_j}{x-x_j}y_j.$$

If the weights $\textstyle w_j$ have been pre-computed, this requires only $\mathcal O(k)$ operations compared to $\textstyle \mathcal O(k^2)$ for evaluating each Lagrange basis polynomial $\textstyle \ell_j(x)$ individually. (See Big O notation.)

The barycentric interpolation formula can also easily be updated to incorporate a new node $\textstyle x_{k+1}$ by dividing each of the $\textstyle w_j$, $j = 0 \dots k$ by $\textstyle (x_j - x_{k+1})$ and constructing the new $\textstyle w_{k+1}$ as above.

For any $x$, $\sum_{j=0}^k \ell_j(x) = 1$ because the constant function $g(x) = 1$ is the unique polynomial of degree $\leq k$ interpolating the data $\{(x_0, 1), (x_1, 1), \ldots, (x_k, 1) \}$. We can thus further simplify the barycentric formula by dividing $L(x) = L(x) / g(x)$:

$$\begin{aligned}
L(x) &= \ell(x) \sum_{j=0}^k \frac{w_j}{x-x_j}y_j \Bigg/ \ell(x) \sum_{j=0}^k \frac{w_j}{x-x_j} \\[10mu]
&= \sum_{j=0}^k \frac{w_j}{x-x_j}y_j \Bigg/ \sum_{j=0}^k \frac{w_j}{x-x_j}.
\end{aligned}$$

This is called the second form or true form of the barycentric interpolation formula.

This second form has advantages in computation cost and accuracy: it avoids evaluation of $\ell(x)$; the work to compute each term in the denominator $w_j/(x-x_j)$ has already been done in computing $\bigl(w_j/(x-x_j)\bigr)y_j$ and so computing the sum in the denominator costs only $k$ addition operations; for evaluation points $x$ which are close to one of the nodes $x_j$, catastrophic cancelation would ordinarily be a problem for the value $(x-x_j)$, however this quantity appears in both numerator and denominator and the two cancel leaving good relative accuracy in the final result.

Using this formula to evaluate $L(x)$ at one of the nodes $x_j$ will result in the indeterminate $\infty y_j/\infty$; computer implementations must replace such results by $L(x_j) = y_j.$

Each Lagrange basis polynomial can also be written in barycentric form:

$$\ell_j(x) = \frac{w_j}{x-x_j} \Bigg/ \sum_{m=0}^k \frac{w_m}{x-x_m}.$$

== A perspective from linear algebra ==
Solving an interpolation problem leads to a problem in linear algebra amounting to inversion of a matrix. Using a standard monomial basis for our interpolation polynomial $L(x) = \sum_{j=0}^k x^j m_j$, we must invert the Vandermonde matrix $(x_i)^j$ to solve $L(x_i) = y_i$ for the coefficients $m_j$ of $L(x)$. By choosing a better basis, the Lagrange basis, $L(x) = \sum_{j=0}^k \ell_j(x) y_j$, we merely get the identity matrix, $\delta_{ij}$, which is its own inverse: the Lagrange basis automatically inverts the analog of the Vandermonde matrix.

More explicitly, let $L$ be the inverse Vandermonde matrix such that:
$$L = \begin{pmatrix} L_{00} & \cdots & L_{0n} \\ \vdots & \ddots & \vdots \\ L_{n0} & \cdots & L_{nn} \end{pmatrix}.$$
The Lagrange basis polynomial $\ell_j(x)$ can be expressed directly using the columns of $L$:
$$\ell_j(x) = L_{0j} + L_{1j} x + \cdots + L_{nj} x^n.$$

This construction is analogous to the Chinese remainder theorem. Instead of checking for remainders of integers modulo prime numbers, we are checking for remainders of polynomials when divided by linears.

Furthermore, when the order is large, Fast Fourier transformation can be used to solve for the coefficients of the interpolated polynomial.

In numerical practice, directly computing $L$ by inverting the Vandermonde matrix is generally avoided because Vandermonde matrices are notoriously ill-conditioned. As the number of nodes or their degree increases, their condition number grows exponentially, making direct matrix inversion numerically unstable and highly sensitive to floating-point errors; where exactness is required, these errors can be circumvented by converting floating-point values into exact rational numbers and performing the inversion in exact rational arithmetic.

== Example ==
We wish to interpolate $f(x) = x^2$ over the domain $1 \leq x \leq 3$ at the three nodes $\{1,\, 2,\, 3\}$:

$$\begin{align}
x_0 & = 1, & & & y_0 = f(x_0) & = 1, \\[3mu]
x_1 & = 2, & & & y_1 = f(x_1) & = 4, \\[3mu]
x_2 & = 3, & & & y_2 = f(x_2) & =9.
\end{align}$$

The node polynomial $\ell$ is
$$\ell(x) = (x-1)(x-2)(x-3) = x^3 - 6x^2 + 11x - 6.$$

The barycentric weights are
$$\begin{align}
w_0 &= (1-2)^{-1}(1-3)^{-1} = \tfrac12, \\[3mu]
w_1 &= (2-1)^{-1}(2-3)^{-1} = -1, \\[3mu]
w_2 &= (3-1)^{-1}(3-2)^{-1} = \tfrac12.
\end{align}$$

The Lagrange basis polynomials are

$$\begin{align}
\ell_0(x) &= \frac{x - 2}{1 - 2}\cdot\frac{x - 3}{1 - 3} = \tfrac12x^2 - \tfrac52x + 3, \\[5mu]
\ell_1(x) &= \frac{x - 1}{2 - 1}\cdot\frac{x - 3}{2 - 3} = -x^2 + 4x - 3, \\[5mu]
\ell_2(x) &= \frac{x - 1}{3 - 1}\cdot\frac{x - 2}{3 - 2} = \tfrac12x^2 - \tfrac32x + 1.
\end{align}$$

The Lagrange interpolating polynomial is:
$$\begin{align}
L(x) &= y_0 \cdot \ell_0(x)
+ y_1 \cdot \ell_1(x)
+ y_2 \cdot \ell_2(x)
= x^2.
\end{align}$$

In (second) barycentric form,

$$L(x) = \frac
{\displaystyle \sum_{j=0}^2 \frac{w_j}{x-x_j}y_j}
{\displaystyle \sum_{j=0}^2 \frac{w_j}{x-x_j}}
= \frac
{\displaystyle \frac{\tfrac12}{x - 1} + \frac{-4}{x - 2} + \frac{\tfrac92}{x - 3}}
{\displaystyle \frac{\tfrac12}{x - 1} + \frac{-1}{x - 2} + \frac{\tfrac12}{x - 3}}.$$

== Notes ==
Polynomial interpolation suffers from significant oscillations near the endpoints (Runge's phenomenon) when using equidistant nodes. The oscillation is much smaller when using Chebyshev nodes.

The Lagrange form of the interpolation polynomial shows the linear character of polynomial interpolation and the uniqueness of the interpolation polynomial. Therefore, it is preferred in proofs and theoretical arguments. Uniqueness can also be seen from the invertibility of the Vandermonde matrix, due to the non-vanishing of the Vandermonde determinant.

But, as can be seen from the construction, each time a node $x_k$ changes, all Lagrange basis polynomials have to be recalculated. A better form of the interpolation polynomial for practical (or computational) purposes is the barycentric form of the Lagrange interpolation (see below) or Newton polynomials.

Lagrange and other interpolation at equally spaced points, as in the example above, yield a polynomial oscillating above and below the true function. This behaviour tends to grow with the number of points, leading to a divergence known as Runge's phenomenon; the problem may be eliminated by choosing interpolation points at Chebyshev nodes.

The Lagrange basis polynomials can be used in numerical integration to derive the Newton–Cotes formulas.

== Remainder in Lagrange interpolation formula ==
When interpolating a given function $f$ by a polynomial of degree $k$ at the nodes $x_0,\dots, x_k$ we get the remainder $R(x) = f(x) - L(x)$ which can be expressed as

$$\begin{align}
R(x) &= f[x_0,\ldots,x_k,x] \ell(x) \\[1ex]
&= \ell(x) \frac{f^{(k+1)}(\xi)}{(k+1)!}, & x_0 < \xi < x_k,
\end{align}$$

where $f[x_0,\ldots,x_k,x]$ is the notation for divided differences. Alternatively, the remainder can be expressed as a contour integral in complex domain as

$$\begin{align}
R(x) &= \frac{\ell(x)}{2\pi i} \int_C \frac{f(t)}{(t-x)(t-x_0) \cdots (t-x_k)} dt \\[1ex]
&= \frac{\ell(x)}{2\pi i} \int_C \frac{f(t)}{(t-x)\ell(t)} dt.
\end{align}$$

The remainder can be bound as

$$|R(x)| \leq \frac{(x_k-x_0)^{k+1}}{(k+1)!}\max_{x_0 \leq \xi \leq x_k} |f^{(k+1)}(\xi)|.$$

=== Derivation ===
Clearly, $R(x)$ is zero at nodes. To find $R(x)$ at a point $x_p$, define a new function $F(x) = R(x)-\tilde{R}(x) = f(x)-L(x)-\tilde{R}(x)$ and choose $\tilde{R}(x) = C\cdot\prod_{i=0}^k(x-x_i)$ where $C$ is the constant we are required to determine for a given $x_p$. We choose $C$ so that $F(x)$ has $k+2$ zeroes (at all nodes and $x_p$) between $x_0$ and $x_k$ (including endpoints). Assuming that $f(x)$ is $k+1$-times differentiable, since $L(x)$ and $\tilde{R}(x)$ are polynomials, and therefore, are infinitely differentiable, $F(x)$ will be $k+1$-times differentiable. By Rolle's theorem, $F^{(1)}(x)$ has $k+1$ zeroes, $F^{(2)}(x)$ has $k$ zeroes... $F^{(k+1)}$ has 1 zero, say $\xi$, where $x_0 < \xi < x_k$. Explicitly writing $F^{(k+1)}(\xi)$:

$$F^{(k+1)}(\xi)=f^{(k+1)}(\xi)-L^{(k+1)}(\xi)-\tilde{R}^{(k+1)}(\xi)$$
$$L^{(k+1)}=0,\tilde{R}^{(k+1)}=C\cdot(k+1)!$$
(Because the highest power of $x$ in $\tilde{R}(x)$ is $k+1$)

$$0=f^{(k+1)}(\xi)-C\cdot(k+1)!$$

The equation can be rearranged as

$$C=\frac{f^{(k+1)}(\xi)}{(k+1)!}$$
Since $F(x_p) = 0$ we have $R(x_p)=\tilde{R}(x_p) = \frac{f^{k+1}(\xi)}{(k+1)!} \prod_{i=0}^k(x_p-x_i)$

== Derivatives ==
The $d$th derivative of a Lagrange interpolating polynomial can be written in terms of the derivatives of the basis polynomials,

$$L^{(d)}(x) := \sum_{j=0}^{k} y_j \ell_j^{(d)}(x).$$

Recall (see § Definition above) that each Lagrange basis polynomial is

$$\begin{aligned}
\ell_j(x) &= \prod_{\begin{smallmatrix}m = 0\\ m\neq j\end{smallmatrix}}^k \frac{x-x_m}{x_j-x_m}.
\end{aligned}$$

The first derivative can be found using the product rule:

$$\begin{align}
\ell_j'(x) &= \sum_{\begin{smallmatrix}i=0 \\ i\not=j\end{smallmatrix}}^k \Biggl[ \frac{1}{x_j-x_i}\prod_{\begin{smallmatrix}m=0 \\ m\not = (i , j)\end{smallmatrix}}^k \frac{x-x_m}{x_j-x_m} \Biggr]
\\[5mu]
&= \ell_j(x)\sum_{\begin{smallmatrix}i=0 \\i\not=j\end{smallmatrix}}^k \frac{1}{x-x_i}.
\end{align}$$

The second derivative is

$$\begin{align}
\ell_j''(x)
&= \sum_{\begin{smallmatrix}i=0 \\ i\ne j\end{smallmatrix}}^{k} \frac{1}{x_j-x_i} \Biggl[ \sum_{\begin{smallmatrix}m=0 \\ m\ne(i,j)\end{smallmatrix}}^{k} \Biggl( \frac{1}{x_j-x_m} \prod_{\begin{smallmatrix}n=0 \\ n\ne(i,j,m)\end{smallmatrix}}^{k} \frac{x-x_n}{x_j-x_n} \Biggr) \Biggr]
\\[10mu]
&= \ell_j(x) \sum_{0 \leq i < m \leq k} \frac{2}{(x-x_i)(x - x_m)}
\\[10mu]
&= \ell_j(x)\Biggl[\Biggl(\sum_{\begin{smallmatrix}i=0 \\i\not=j\end{smallmatrix}}^k \frac{1}{x-x_i}\Biggr)^2 - \sum_{\begin{smallmatrix}i=0 \\i\not=j\end{smallmatrix}}^k \frac{1}{(x-x_i)^2}\Biggr].
\end{align}$$

The third derivative is

$$\begin{align}
\ell_j'''(x)
&= \ell_j(x)
\sum_{0 \leq i < m < n \leq k}
\frac{3!}{(x-x_i)(x - x_m)(x - x_n)}
\end{align}$$

and likewise for higher derivatives.

Note that all of these formulas for derivatives are invalid at or near a node. A method of evaluating all orders of derivatives of a Lagrange polynomial efficiently at all points of the domain, including the nodes, is converting the Lagrange polynomial to power basis form and then evaluating the derivatives.

== Multivariate case ==
A Lagrange basis can also be constructed in the multivariate case. Let

$$f(\mathbf{x}) = \sum_{i=0}^{U-1} \alpha_i {\mathbf x}^{\mathbf{k}_i}$$

be a degree-$d$ polynomial on $n$ variables, where $U = \binom{n+d}{n}$ is the number of terms and

$${\mathbf x}^{\mathbf{k}_i} = \prod_{j=0}^{n-1} x_j^{k_{ij}}.$$

Let then $M$ be the $U \times U$ matrix with elements

$$M_{ab} = \mathbf{t}_a^{\mathbf{k}_b}$$

for some set of points $\{\mathbf{t}_i\}_{i=0}^{U-1}$. This set of points uniquely determines the polynomial $f$ iff $\Delta:=\det(M) \neq 0$. In this case we can construct the Lagrange basis as follows:

$$\ell_i(\mathbf{x}) = \frac{\Delta_i(\mathbf{x})}{\Delta},$$

where $\Delta_i(\mathbf{x})$ is the determinant of the matrix $M^{(i)}(\mathbf{x})$ with elements

$$M^{(i)}(\mathbf{x})_{ab} = \delta_{ai}\mathbf{x}_a^{\mathbf{k}_b} + (1-\delta_{ai})\mathbf{t}_a^{\mathbf{k}_b}.$$

Then it holds that

$$f(\mathbf{x}) = \sum_{i=0}^{U-1} f(\mathbf{t}_i) \ell_i( {\mathbf x})$$

== Finite fields ==
The Lagrange polynomial can also be computed in finite fields. This has applications in cryptography, such as in Shamir's Secret Sharing scheme.

== Relation to matrix theory ==
When a square matrix has distinct eigenvalues, as a special case of Hermite interpolation's relation to matrix theory, the interpolation reduces to Lagrange interpolation.

== See also ==
- Neville's algorithm
- Newton form of the interpolation polynomial
- Bernstein polynomial
- Carlson's theorem
- Lebesgue constant
- The Chebfun system
- Table of Newtonian series
- Frobenius covariant
- Sylvester's formula
- Finite difference coefficient
- Hermite interpolation
