= Divided differences =

Algorithm for computing polynomial coefficients

In mathematics, divided differences is an algorithm, historically used for computing tables of logarithms and trigonometric functions. Charles Babbage's difference engine, an early mechanical calculator, was designed to use this algorithm in its operation.

Divided differences is a recursive division process. Given a sequence of data points $(x_0, y_0), \ldots, (x_{n}, y_{n})$, the method calculates the coefficients of the interpolation polynomial of these points in the Newton form.

It is sometimes denoted by a delta with a bar: $\text{△} \!\!\!|\,\,$ or $\text{◿} \! \text{◺}$.

== Definition ==
Given n + 1 data points
$$(x_0, y_0),\ldots,(x_{n}, y_{n})$$
where the $x_k$ are assumed to be pairwise distinct, the forward divided differences are defined as:
$$\begin{align}
\mathopen[y_k] &:= y_k, && k \in \{ 0,\ldots,n\} \\
\mathopen[y_k,\ldots,y_j] &:= \frac{[y_{k+1},\ldots , y_j] - [y_{k},\ldots , y_{j-1}]}{x_j-x_k}, && k\in\{0,\ldots,n-1\},\ j\in\{k+1,\ldots,n\}.
\end{align}$$

To make the recursive process of computation clearer, the divided differences can be put in tabular form, where the columns correspond to the value of j above, and each entry in the table is computed from the difference of the entries to its immediate lower left and to its immediate upper left, divided by a difference of corresponding x-values:
$$\begin{matrix}
x_0 & y_0 = [y_0] &           &               & \\
&       & [y_0,y_1] &               & \\
x_1 & y_1 = [y_1] &           & [y_0,y_1,y_2] & \\
&       & [y_1,y_2] &               & [y_0,y_1,y_2,y_3]\\
x_2 & y_2 = [y_2] &           & [y_1,y_2,y_3] & \\
&       & [y_2,y_3] &               & \\
x_3 & y_3 = [y_3] &           &               & \\
\end{matrix}$$

=== Notation ===
Note that the divided difference $[y_k,\ldots,y_{k+j}]$ depends on the values $x_k,\ldots,x_{k+j}$ and $y_k,\ldots,y_{k+j}$, but the notation hides the dependency on the x-values. If the data points are given by a function f,
$$(x_0, y_0), \ldots, (x_n, y_n)
=(x_0, f(x_0)), \ldots, (x_n, f(x_n))$$
one sometimes writes the divided difference in the notation
$$f[x_k,\ldots,x_{k+j}]
\ \stackrel{\text{def}}= \  [f(x_k),\ldots,f(x_{k+j})]
= [y_k,\ldots,y_{k+j}].$$
Other notations for the divided difference of the function ƒ on the nodes x_{0}, ..., x_{n} are:
$$f[x_k,\ldots,x_{k+j}]=\mathopen[x_0,\ldots,x_n]f=
\mathopen[x_0,\ldots,x_n;f]=
D[x_0,\ldots,x_n]f.$$

== Example ==
Divided differences for $k=0$ and the first few values of $j$:
$$\begin{align}
\mathopen[y_0] &= y_0 \\
\mathopen[y_0,y_1] &= \frac{y_1-y_0}{x_1-x_0} \\
\mathopen[y_0,y_1,y_2]
&= \frac{\mathopen[y_1,y_2]-\mathopen[y_0,y_1]}{x_2-x_0}
=  \frac{\frac{y_2-y_1}{x_2-x_1}-\frac{y_1-y_0}{x_1-x_0}}{x_2-x_0}
= \frac{y_2-y_1}{(x_2-x_1)(x_2-x_0)}-\frac{y_1-y_0}{(x_1-x_0)(x_2-x_0)}
\\
\mathopen[y_0,y_1,y_2,y_3] &= \frac{\mathopen[y_1,y_2,y_3]-\mathopen[y_0,y_1,y_2]}{x_3-x_0}
\end{align}$$

Thus, the table corresponding to these terms up to two columns has the following form:
$$\begin{matrix}
x_0 & y_{0} &                                 & \\
&        & {y_{1}-y_{0}\over x_1 - x_0}  & \\
x_1 & y_{1} &                                 & {{y_{2}-y_{1}\over x_2 - x_1}-{y_{1}-y_{0}\over x_1 - x_0} \over x_2 - x_0} \\
&        & {y_{2}-y_{1}\over x_2 - x_1}  & \\
x_2 & y_{2} &                                 & \vdots \\
&        & \vdots                          & \\
\vdots &        &                                 & \vdots \\
&        & \vdots                          & \\
x_n & y_{n} &                                 & \\
\end{matrix}$$

== Properties ==
- Linearity
  $$\begin{align}
(f+g)[x_0,\dots,x_n] &= f[x_0,\dots,x_n] + g[x_0,\dots,x_n] \\
(\lambda\cdot f)[x_0,\dots,x_n] &= \lambda\cdot f[x_0,\dots,x_n]
\end{align}$$
- Leibniz rule
  $$(f\cdot g)[x_0,\dots,x_n] = f[x_0]\cdot g[x_0,\dots,x_n] + f[x_0,x_1]\cdot g[x_1,\dots,x_n] + \dots + f[x_0,\dots,x_n]\cdot g[x_n] = \sum_{r=0}^n f[x_0,\ldots,x_r]\cdot g[x_r,\ldots,x_n]$$
- Divided differences are symmetric: If $\sigma : \{0, \dots, n\} \to \{0, \dots, n\}$ is a permutation then
  $$f[x_0, \dots, x_n] = f[x_{\sigma(0)}, \dots, x_{\sigma(n)}]$$
- Polynomial interpolation in the Newton form: if $P$ is a polynomial function of degree $\leq n$, and $p[x_0, \dots , x_n]$ is the divided difference, then
  $$P_{n-1}(x) = p[x_0] + p[x_0,x_1](x-x_0) + p[x_0,x_1,x_2](x-x_0)(x-x_1) + \cdots + p[x_0,\ldots,x_n] (x-x_0)(x-x_1)\cdots(x-x_{n-1})$$
- If $p$ is a polynomial function of degree $<n$, then
  $$p[x_0, \dots, x_n] = 0.$$
- Mean value theorem for divided differences: if $f$ is n times differentiable, then
  $$f[x_0,\dots,x_n] = \frac{f^{(n)}(\xi)}{n!}$$
  for a number $\xi$ in the open interval determined by the smallest and largest of the $x_k$'s.

== Matrix form ==
The divided difference scheme can be put into an upper triangular matrix:
$$T_f(x_0,\dots,x_n)=
\begin{pmatrix}
f[x_0] & f[x_0,x_1] & f[x_0,x_1,x_2] & \ldots & f[x_0,\dots,x_n] \\
0      & f[x_1]     & f[x_1,x_2]     & \ldots & f[x_1,\dots,x_n] \\
0      & 0          & f[x_2]         & \ldots & f[x_2,\dots,x_n] \\
\vdots & \vdots     &                & \ddots & \vdots           \\
0      & 0          & 0              & \ldots & f[x_n]
\end{pmatrix}.$$

Then it holds

- $T_{f+g}(x) = T_f(x) + T_g(x)$
- $T_{\lambda f}(x) = \lambda T_f(x)$ if $\lambda$ is a scalar
- $T_{f\cdot g}(x) = T_f(x) \cdot T_g(x)$
  This follows from the Leibniz rule. It means that multiplication of such matrices is commutative. Summarised, the matrices of divided difference schemes with respect to the same set of nodes x form a commutative ring.
- Since $T_f(x)$ is a triangular matrix, its eigenvalues are obviously $f(x_0), \dots, f(x_n)$.
- Let $\delta_\xi$ be a Kronecker delta-like function, that is
  $$\delta_\xi(t) = \begin{cases}
1 &: t=\xi , \\
0 &: \mbox{else}.
\end{cases}$$
  Obviously $f\cdot \delta_\xi = f(\xi)\cdot \delta_\xi$, thus $\delta_\xi$ is an eigenfunction of the pointwise function multiplication. That is $T_{\delta_{x_i}}(x)$ is somehow an "eigenmatrix" of $T_f(x)$: $T_f(x) \cdot T_{\delta_{x_i}} (x) = f(x_i) \cdot T_{\delta_{x_i}}(x)$. However, all columns of $T_{\delta_{x_i}}(x)$ are multiples of each other, the matrix rank of $T_{\delta_{x_i}}(x)$ is 1. So you can compose the matrix of all eigenvectors of $T_f(x)$ from the $i$-th column of each $T_{\delta_{x_i}}(x)$. Denote the matrix of eigenvectors with $U(x)$. Example
  $$U(x_0,x_1,x_2,x_3) = \begin{pmatrix}
1 & \frac{1}{(x_1-x_0)} & \frac{1}{(x_2-x_0) (x_2-x_1)} & \frac{1}{(x_3-x_0) (x_3-x_1) (x_3-x_2)} \\
0 & 1 & \frac{1}{(x_2-x_1)} & \frac{1}{(x_3-x_1) (x_3-x_2)} \\
0 & 0 & 1 & \frac{1}{(x_3-x_2)} \\
0 & 0 & 0 & 1
\end{pmatrix}$$
  The diagonalization of $T_f(x)$ can be written as
  $$U(x) \cdot \operatorname{diag}(f(x_0),\dots,f(x_n)) = T_f(x) \cdot U(x) .$$

=== Polynomials and power series ===
The matrix
$$J =
\begin{pmatrix}
x_0 & 1 & 0 & 0 & \cdots & 0 \\
0 & x_1 & 1 & 0 & \cdots & 0 \\
0 & 0 & x_2 & 1 &        & 0 \\
\vdots & \vdots & & \ddots & \ddots & \\
0 & 0 & 0 & 0 &    \; \ddots     & 1\\
0 & 0 & 0 & 0 &          & x_n
\end{pmatrix}$$
contains the divided difference scheme for the identity function with respect to the nodes $x_0,\dots,x_n$, thus $J^m$ contains the divided differences for the power function with exponent $m$. Consequently, you can obtain the divided differences for a polynomial function $p$ by applying $p$ to the matrix $J$: If
$$p(\xi) = a_0 + a_1 \cdot \xi + \dots + a_m \cdot \xi^m$$
and
$$p(J) = a_0 + a_1\cdot J + \dots + a_m\cdot J^m$$
then
$$T_p(x) = p(J).$$
This is known as Opitz' formula.

Now consider increasing the degree of $p$ to infinity, i.e. turn the Taylor polynomial into a Taylor series. Let $f$ be a function which corresponds to a power series. You can compute the divided difference scheme for $f$ by applying the corresponding matrix series to $J$: If
$$f(\xi) = \sum_{k=0}^\infty a_k \xi^k$$
and
$$f(J)=\sum_{k=0}^\infty a_k J^k$$
then
$$T_f(x)=f(J).$$

== Alternative characterizations ==
=== Expanded form ===
$$\begin{align}
f[x_0] &= f(x_0) \\
f[x_0,x_1] &= \frac{f(x_0)}{(x_0-x_1)} + \frac{f(x_1)}{(x_1-x_0)} \\
f[x_0,x_1,x_2] &= \frac{f(x_0)}{(x_0-x_1)\cdot(x_0-x_2)} + \frac{f(x_1)}{(x_1-x_0)\cdot(x_1-x_2)} + \frac{f(x_2)}{(x_2-x_0)\cdot(x_2-x_1)} \\
f[x_0,x_1,x_2,x_3] &= \frac{f(x_0)}{(x_0-x_1)\cdot(x_0-x_2)\cdot(x_0-x_3)} + \frac{f(x_1)}{(x_1-x_0)\cdot(x_1-x_2)\cdot(x_1-x_3)} +\\
&\quad\quad \frac{f(x_2)}{(x_2-x_0)\cdot(x_2-x_1)\cdot(x_2-x_3)} + \frac{f(x_3)}{(x_3-x_0)\cdot(x_3-x_1)\cdot(x_3-x_2)} \\
f[x_0,\dots,x_n] &=
\sum_{j=0}^{n} \frac{f(x_j)}{\prod_{k\in\{0,\dots,n\}\setminus\{j\}} (x_j-x_k)}
\end{align}$$

With the help of the polynomial function $\omega(\xi) = (\xi-x_0) \cdots (\xi-x_n)$ this can be written as
$$f[x_0,\dots,x_n] = \sum_{j=0}^{n} \frac{f(x_j)}{\omega'(x_j)}.$$

=== Peano form ===
If $x_0<x_1<\cdots<x_n$ and $n\geq 1$, the divided differences can be expressed as
$$f[x_0,\ldots,x_n] = \frac{1}{(n-1)!} \int_{x_0}^{x_n} f^{(n)}(t)\;B_{n-1}(t) \, dt$$
where $f^{(n)}$ is the $n$-th derivative of the function $f$ and $B_{n-1}$ is a certain B-spline of degree $n-1$ for the data points $x_0,\dots,x_n$, given by the formula
$$B_{n-1}(t) = \sum_{k=0}^n \frac{(\max(0,x_k-t))^{n-1}}{\omega'(x_k)}$$

This is a consequence of the Peano kernel theorem; it is called the Peano form of the divided differences and $B_{n-1}$ is the Peano kernel for the divided differences, all named after Giuseppe Peano.

=== Hermite–Genocchi formula ===
When $f$ is $n$ times continuously differentiable on a convex domain containing the nodes $x_0, \dots, x_n$, including the confluent case of repeated nodes in arbitrary order (see § Generalization), the divided difference can be expressed as an integral over a $n$-simplex $\Delta_n$:
$$f[x_0, \dots, x_n] = \int_{\Delta_n} f^{(n)}({\textstyle \sum_{k=0}^n t_k x_k}) \, dt_0 \cdots dt_n,$$
where
$$\Delta_n = \{ (t_0, \dots, t_n) \in \R^n \mid t_i \ge 0, \, {\textstyle \sum_{k=0}^n t_k = 1} \}$$
is the $n$-simplex.

=== Cauchy's integral formula ===
When $f$ is analytic on a simply connected domain $\Omega \subset \C$ containing the nodes $x_0, \dots, x_n$, including the confluent case of repeated nodes in arbitrary order (see § Generalization), the divided difference admits a contour integral representation via Cauchy's integral formula:
$$f[x_0, \dots, x_n] = \frac{1}{2\pi i} \oint_{\Gamma} \frac{f(z)}{\prod_{k=0}^n (z - x_k)} \, dz,$$
where $\Gamma$ is a positively oriented, simple closed contour in $\Omega$ enclosing all the nodes $x_0, \dots, x_n$.

=== Forward and backward differences ===
When the data points are equidistantly distributed we get the special case called forward differences. They are easier to calculate than the more general divided differences.

Given n+1 data points
$$(x_0, y_0), \ldots, (x_n, y_n)$$
with
$$x_{k} = x_0 + k h,\ \text{ for } \ k=0,\ldots,n \text{ and fixed } h>0$$
the forward differences are defined as:
$$\begin{align}
\Delta^{(0)} y_k &:= y_k,\qquad k=0,\ldots,n \\
\Delta^{(j)}y_k &:= \Delta^{(j-1)}y_{k+1} - \Delta^{(j-1)}y_k,\qquad k=0,\ldots,n-j,\ j=1,\dots,n.
\end{align}$$
whereas the backward differences are defined as:
$$\begin{align}
\nabla^{(0)} y_k &:= y_k,\qquad k=0,\ldots,n \\
\nabla^{(j)}y_k &:= \nabla^{(j-1)}y_{k} - \nabla^{(j-1)}y_{k-1},\qquad k=0,\ldots,n-j,\ j=1,\dots,n.
\end{align}$$
Thus the forward difference table is written as:
$$\begin{matrix}
y_0 &               &                   &                  \\
& \Delta y_0 &                   &                  \\
y_1 &               & \Delta^2 y_0 &                  \\
& \Delta y_1 &                   & \Delta^3 y_0\\
y_2 &               & \Delta^2 y_1 &                  \\
& \Delta y_2 &                   &                  \\
y_3 &               &                   &                  \\
\end{matrix}$$
whereas the backwards difference table is written as:
$$\begin{matrix}
y_0 &               &                   &                  \\
& \nabla y_1 &                   &                  \\
y_1 &               & \nabla^2 y_2 &                  \\
& \nabla y_2 &                   & \nabla^3 y_3\\
y_2 &               & \nabla^2 y_3 &                  \\
& \nabla y_3 &                   &                  \\
y_3 &               &                   &                  \\
\end{matrix}$$

The relationship between divided differences and forward differences is
$$[y_j, y_{j+1}, \ldots , y_{j+k}] = \frac{1}{k!h^k}\Delta^{(k)}y_j,$$
whereas for backward differences:
$$[{y}_{j}, y_{j-1},\ldots,{y}_{j-k}] = \frac{1}{k!h^k}\nabla^{(k)}y_j.$$

=== Explicit formula ===
When the data points are equispaced we can also derive an explicit formula for $[y_j,\ldots,y_{j+k}]$. For any fixed $k \leq n$ and $j$ such that $j + k \leq n$,
$$[y_j,\ldots,y_{j+ k}] = \frac{(-1)^{j+k}}{k!h^k} \sum_{i=j}^{j+k} (-1)^i y_i \binom{k}{i-j}.$$

Proof. We prove this by induction on $k$:

Base case: Let $k = 0$ and $j = 0 \ldots n$. Then by definition $[y_j] = y_j$, and
$$\frac{(-1)^{j}}{0!h^0} \sum_{i=j}^{j} (-1)^i y_i \binom{0}{i-j} = (-1)^{2j} y_j = y_j.$$

Induction step: Assume the above formula holds until $k$ and consider $j$ such that $j+k+1 \leq n$. By the recursive definition we have

$$[y_j,\ldots,y_{j+k+1}] = \frac{1}{h(k+1)} \left ( [y_{j+1},\ldots,y_{j+k+1}] - [y_j,\ldots,y_{j+k}] \right ).$$

We can use our inductive hypothesis on both members of the left side, and obtain

$$\frac{1}{h(k+1)} \left ( \frac{(-1)^{j+k+1}}{k!h^k} \sum_{i=j+1}^{j+k+1} (-1)^i y_i \binom{k}{i-j} - \frac{(-1)^{j+k}}{k!h^k} \sum_{i=j}^{j+k} (-1)^i y_i \binom{k}{i-j} \right ).$$

This can be rearranged as

$$\frac{(-1)^{j+k+1}}{(k+1)!h^{k+1}} \sum_{i=j}^{j+k+1} (-1)^i y_i \left ( \binom{k}{i-j} + \binom{k}{i-j-1} \right )$$

where $\binom{k}{s} = 0$ when $s < k$. We obtain our thesis for $k+1$ by substituting the identity
$$\binom{k}{i - j} + \binom{k}{i - j - 1} = \binom{k + 1}{i - j}.$$

== Generalization ==
When some of the nodes $x_0, \dots, x_n$ coincide, the recursive definition of standard divided differences involves division by zero and can no longer be applied directly. In this confluent case, divided differences incorporate higher-order derivatives of the function $f$. The resulting values are known as confluent divided differences or generalized divided differences. Conceptually, node confluence bridges discrete divided differences and continuous calculus, replacing finite differences with exact higher-order derivatives as nodes coalesce.

Let $x_0, \dots, x_n$ consist of nodes with arbitrary repetitions and order. Suppose there are $m$ distinct values $z_1, \dots, z_m$ among the nodes, with corresponding multiplicities $\mu_1, \dots, \mu_m \ge 1$ such that $\textstyle \sum_{i=1}^{m} \mu_i = n + 1$. Let $f$ be a function that is $\mu_i - 1$ times differentiable at $z_i$ for $i = 1, \dots, m$.

Confluent divided differences can be defined as the limit:
$$f[x_0, \dots, x_n] = \lim_{\xi_0 \to x_0, \dots, \xi_n \to x_n} f[\xi_0, \dots, \xi_n]$$
where $\xi_0, \dots, \xi_n$ are pairwise distinct nodes converging to $x_0, \dots, x_n$, provided the limit exists.

In practice, any confluent divided difference with arbitrarily ordered repeated nodes can be computed by first permuting the node sequence so that identical nodes are adjacent, and then constructing the divided difference table with an additional higher-order derivative substitution rule.

Divided differences remain symmetric in $x_0, \dots, x_n$ in the confluent case, satisfying:
$$f[x_0, \dots, x_n] = f[x_{\sigma(0)}, \dots, x_{\sigma(n)}]$$
where $\sigma$ is a permutation that reorders $x_0, \dots, x_n$.

Consider the case where $\sigma$ reorders $x_0, \dots, x_n$ such that identical nodes become contiguous:
$$(x_{\sigma(0)}, \dots, x_{\sigma(n)}) = (\underbrace{z_1, \dots, z_1}_{\mu_1 \text{ times}}, \underbrace{z_2, \dots, z_2}_{\mu_2 \text{ times}}, \dots, \underbrace{z_m, \dots, z_m}_{\mu_m \text{ times}}).$$
In this case, the divided difference table is constructed using the standard recursive formula whenever the outer nodes are distinct. When evaluating divided differences on $i+1$ identical nodes $z_j$, the calculation reduces to and coincides with a scaled higher-order derivative of $f$:
$$f[\underbrace{z_j, \dots, z_j}_{i+1 \text{ times}}] = \frac{f^{(i)}(z_j)}{i!}.$$
All other entries in the divided difference table are then computed using the standard recursive rule.

=== Generalized case example ===
To evaluate a confluent divided difference with non-adjacent repeated nodes, such as $f[z_1, z_2, z_1]$, the node sequence is first permuted to group identical nodes contiguously:
$$f[z_1, z_2, z_1] = f[z_1, z_1, z_2].$$
The evaluation then proceeds by constructing the divided difference table:
$$\begin{matrix}
x_0 = z_1 & f(x_0) &                                & \\
&        & \frac{f'(z_1)}{1!}             & \\
x_1 = z_1 & f(x_1) &                                & \frac{\frac{f(x_2)-f(x_1)}{x_2-x_1} - \frac{f'(z_1)}{1!}}{x_2-x_0} \\
&        & \frac{f(x_2)-f(x_1)}{x_2-x_1}  & \\
x_2 = z_2 & f(x_2) &                                & \\
\end{matrix}$$
Extracting and simplifying the rightmost entry from the resulting divided difference table yields:
$$f[z_1,z_2,z_1] = \frac{f(z_2)-f(z_1)}{(z_2-z_1)^2} - \frac{f'(z_1)}{z_2-z_1}.$$

== See also ==
- Difference quotient
- Neville's algorithm
- Polynomial interpolation
- Mean value theorem for divided differences
- Nörlund–Rice integral
- Pascal's triangle
- Lagrange polynomial
