= Monomial basis =

Basis of polynomials consisting of monomials

In mathematics the monomial basis of a polynomial ring is its basis (as a vector space or free module over the field or ring of coefficients) that consists of all monomials. The monomials form a basis because every polynomial may be uniquely written as a finite linear combination of monomials (this is an immediate consequence of the definition of a polynomial).

== One indeterminate ==
The polynomial ring K[x] of univariate polynomials over a field K is a K-vector space, which has
$$1, x, x^2, x^3, \ldots$$
as an (infinite) basis. More generally, if K is a ring then K[x] is a free module which has the same basis.

The polynomials of degree at most d form also a vector space (or a free module in the case of a ring of coefficients), which has
$$\{ 1, x, x^2, \ldots, x^{d-1}, x^d \}$$
as a basis.

The canonical form of a polynomial is its expression on this basis:
$$a_0 + a_1 x + a_2 x^2 + \dots + a_d x^d,$$
or, using the shorter sigma notation:
$$\sum_{i=0}^d a_ix^i.$$

The monomial basis is naturally totally ordered, either by increasing degrees
$$1 < x < x^2 < \cdots,$$
or by decreasing degrees
$$1 > x > x^2 > \cdots.$$

== Several indeterminates ==
In the case of several indeterminates $x_1, \ldots, x_n,$ a monomial is a product
$$x_1^{d_1}x_2^{d_2}\cdots x_n^{d_n},$$
where the $d_i$ are non-negative integers. As $x_i^0 = 1,$ an exponent equal to zero means that the corresponding indeterminate does not appear in the monomial; in particular $1 = x_1^0 x_2^0\cdots x_n^0$ is a monomial.

Similar to the case of univariate polynomials, the polynomials in $x_1, \ldots, x_n$ form a vector space (if the coefficients belong to a field) or a free module (if the coefficients belong to a ring), which has the set of all monomials as a basis, called the monomial basis.

The homogeneous polynomials of degree $d$ form a subspace which has the monomials of degree $d = d_1+\cdots+d_n$ as a basis. The dimension of this subspace is the number of monomials of degree $d$, which is
$$\binom{d+n-1}{d} = \frac{n(n+1)\cdots (n+d-1)}{d!},$$
where $\binom{d+n-1}{d}$ is a binomial coefficient.

The polynomials of degree at most $d$ form also a subspace, which has the monomials of degree at most $d$ as a basis. The number of these monomials is the dimension of this subspace, equal to
$$\binom{d + n}{d}= \binom{d + n}{n}=\frac{(d+1)\cdots(d+n)}{n!}.$$

In contrast to the univariate case, there is no natural total order of the monomial basis in the multivariate case. For problems which require choosing a total order, such as Gröbner basis computations, one generally chooses an admissible monomial order – that is, a total order on the set of monomials such that
$$m<n \iff mq < nq$$
and
$$1 \leq m$$
for every monomial $m, n, q.$

== In analysis and numerical applications ==
The coefficients of a polynomial (or infinite series) in a monomial basis represent the local behavior near the origin in the complex plane, and are proportional to the values of the various derivatives of the function there (cf. Taylor series). When the series is the Taylor series of some non-polynomial function, it will converge within an origin-centered disk in the complex plane, whose radius is as large as possible such that the function is analytic inside the disk.

Polynomials in monomial basis are generally poor choices for numerical evaluation away from the origin, and other polynomial bases are much better suited for representing a polynomial over a specific real interval or arbitrary region in the complex plane.

== See also ==
- Horner's method
- Polynomial sequence
- Newton polynomial
- Lagrange polynomial
- Legendre polynomial
- Bernstein form
- Chebyshev form
- Vandermonde matrix
