= List of things named after Henri Lebesgue =

In mathematics and physics, many topics are named in honor of French mathematician Henri Léon Lebesgue (1875–1941), who made many important discoveries and innovations.

The following concepts, ideas and theorems are named after Henri Lebesgue:

- Blaschke–Lebesgue theorem
- Cantor–Lebesgue function
- Borel–Lebesgue theorem
- Fatou–Lebesgue theorem
- Lebesgue constant
- Lebesgue covering dimension
- Lebesgue curve
- Lebesgue differentiation theorem
- Lebesgue integration
- Lebesgue measure
  - Infinite-dimensional Lebesgue measure
- Lebesgue point
- Lebesgue space
- Lebesgue–Rokhlin probability space
- Lebesgue–Stieltjes integration
- Lebesgue–Vitali theorem
- Lebesgue spine
- Lebesgue's lemma
- Lebesgue's decomposition theorem
- Lebesgue's density theorem
- Lebesgue's dominated convergence theorem
- Lebesgue's number lemma
- Lebesgue's universal covering problem
- Riemann–Lebesgue lemma
- Walsh–Lebesgue theorem
