= Unisolvent point set =

In mathematics, a finite collection of points $X \subset \mathbb{R}^n$ is often called unisolvent for a space $W$ if any element $w \in W$ is uniquely determined by its values on $X$.
$X$ is unisolvent for $\Pi^m_n$ (polynomials in n variables of degree at most m) if there exists a unique polynomial in $\Pi^m_n$ of lowest possible degree which interpolates the data $X$.

Simple examples in $\mathbb{R}$ would be the fact that two distinct points determine a line, three points determine a parabola, etc. It is clear that over $\mathbb{R}$, any collection of k + 1 distinct points will uniquely determine a polynomial of lowest possible degree in $\Pi^k$.

== See also ==
- Padua points
- Unisolvent functions
- Polynomial interpolation
