= Pestov–Ionin theorem =

Theorem that curves of bounded curvature contain a unit disk

A smooth simple closed curve of curvature at most one, and a unit disk enclosed by it

The Pestov–Ionin theorem in the differential geometry of plane curves states that every simple closed curve of curvature at most one encloses a unit disk. It has also been called the moon in a puddle theorem.

== History and generalizations ==
Although a version of this was published for convex curves by Wilhelm Blaschke in 1916, it is named for German Gavrilovich Pestov and Vladimir Kuzmich Ionin, who published a version of this theorem in 1959 for non-convex doubly differentiable ($C^2$) curves, the curves for which the curvature is well-defined at every point. The theorem has been generalized further, to curves of bounded average curvature (singly differentiable, and satisfying a Lipschitz condition on the derivative), to curves of bounded convex curvature (each point of the curve touches a unit disk that, within some small neighborhood of the point, remains interior to the curve), and to curves whose curvature is bounded in a viscosity sense.

It does not generalize to higher dimensions: there exist surfaces whose principal curvatures are lower bounded by a constant, topologically equivalent to embedded spheres, that do not contain a sphere with that constant curvature. One construction for this is based on the house with two rooms, a topological complex that is contractible but not collapsible.

== Applications ==
The theorem has been applied in algorithms for motion planning. In particular it has been used for finding Dubins paths, shortest routes for vehicles that can move only in a forwards direction and that can turn left or right with a bounded turning radius. It has also been used for planning the motion of the cutter in a milling machine for pocket machining, and in reconstructing curves from scattered data points.
