= Blaschke product =

Analytic function with prescribed zeros

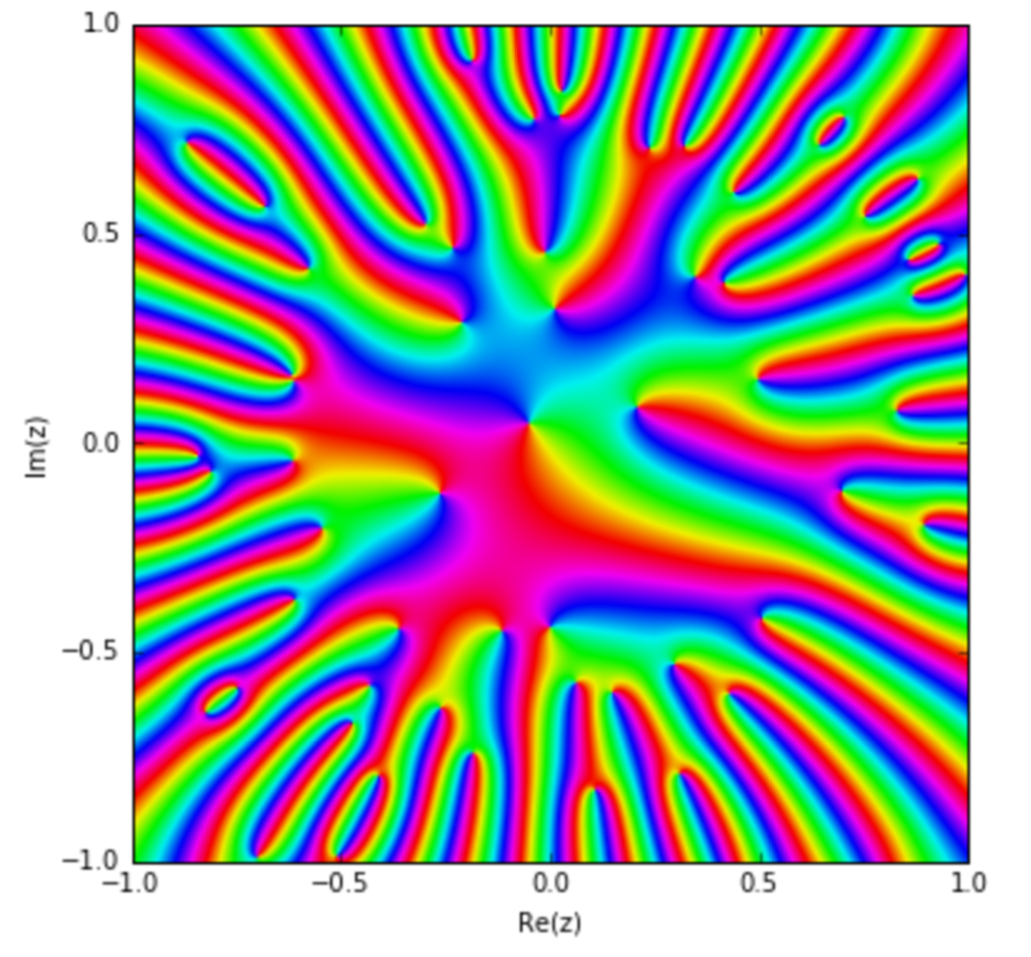
Blaschke product, $B(z)$, associated to 50 randomly chosen points in the unit disk. $B(z)$ is represented as a Matplotlib plot, using a version of the domain coloring method.

In complex analysis, a Blaschke product is a bounded analytic function in the open unit disc constructed to have zeros at a finite or infinite sequence of prescribed complex numbers $a_0,a_1,\ldots$ inside the unit disc, with the property that the magnitude of the function is constant along the boundary of the disc.

Blaschke products were introduced by Wilhelm Blaschke in 1915. They are related to Hardy spaces.

== Definition ==
A sequence of points $(a_n)$ inside the unit disk is said to satisfy the Blaschke condition when

$$\sum_n(1-|a_n|)<\infty.$$

Given a sequence obeying the Blaschke condition, the Blaschke product is defined as

$$B(z)=\prod_n B(a_n,z)$$

with factors

$$B(a,z)=\frac{|a|}{a}\frac{a-z}{1-\overline{a}z}$$

provided $a\neq0$. Here $\overline{a}$ is the complex conjugate of $a$. When $a=0$, take $B(0,z)=z$.

The Blaschke product $B(z)$ defines a function analytic in the open unit disc and vanishing exactly at the points $a_n$, with multiplicity counted. Furthermore, it belongs to the Hardy class $H^\infty$.

The sequence $(a_n)$ satisfying the convergence criterion above is sometimes called a Blaschke sequence.

== Szegő theorem ==
A theorem of Gábor Szegő states that if $f\in H^1$, the Hardy space with integrable norm, and if $f$ is not identically zero, then the zeroes of $f$, which are at most countable, satisfy the Blaschke condition.

== Finite Blaschke products ==
Finite Blaschke products can be characterized as analytic functions on the unit disc in the following way. Assume that $f$ is analytic on the open unit disc and can be extended to a continuous function on the closed unit disc

$$\overline{\Delta}=\{z\in\mathbb C:|z|\leq1\}$$

that maps the unit circle to itself. Then $f$ is equal to a finite Blaschke product

$$B(z)=\zeta\prod_{i=1}^n\left(\frac{z-a_i}{1-\overline{a_i}z}\right)^{m_i},$$

where $\zeta$ lies on the unit circle, $|a_i|<1$, and $m_i$ is the multiplicity of the zero $a_i$. In particular, if $f$ satisfies the condition above and has no zeros inside the unit circle, then $f$ is constant. This fact is also a consequence of the maximum principle for harmonic functions, applied to the harmonic function $\log|f(z)|$.

== Asymptotics of powers ==
For $0<\rho<1$, consider the Blaschke factor

$$b_\rho(z)=\frac{z-\rho}{1-\rho z}$$

and write

$$b_\rho(z)^n=\sum_{k\geq0}\widehat{b_\rho^n}(k)z^k.$$

Set

$$\alpha_0=\frac{1-\rho}{1+\rho}.$$

When $n$ is large and $k$ is proportional to $n$, the asymptotic behavior of these coefficients changes at the two indices $\alpha_0 n$ and $\alpha_0^{-1}n$. If $k/n$ remains in a compact subinterval of $(\alpha_0,\alpha_0^{-1})$, the coefficients have oscillatory stationary-phase asymptotics of order $n^{-1/2}$. Outside this interval they decay exponentially. An Airy-type asymptotic near the transition point $\alpha_0^{-1}n$, approached from inside the interval $(\alpha_0 n,\alpha_0^{-1}n)$, is established in this setting. More generally, near either endpoint, on the scale $|k-\alpha_0^{\pm1}n|=O(n^{1/3})$, the transition is described by the Airy function, and the largest coefficients are of order $n^{-1/3}$.

For $1\leq p\leq\infty$, the corresponding asymptotic orders of the $\ell^p$-norms of the Taylor coefficients are

$$\left\|\widehat{b_\rho^n}\right\|_{\ell^p}
\asymp
\begin{cases}
n^{\,1/p-1/2}, & 1\leq p<4,\\[4pt]
\left(\dfrac{\log n}{n}\right)^{1/4}, & p=4,\\[8pt]
n^{\,1/(3p)-1/3}, & 4<p\leq\infty,
\end{cases}$$

where $1/\infty=0$ and the implicit constants depend on $p$ and $\rho$.

For general finite Blaschke products, the asymptotic size of the largest coefficient of $B^n$ is similarly determined by the maximal degeneracy of the stationary points of the boundary phase of $B$.

== See also ==
- Hardy space
- Weierstrass product
- Complex analysis
