= Lebesgue constant =

Constants related to interpolation errors

In numerical analysis, Lebesgue constants (depending on a set of nodes and of its size) give an idea of how good the interpolant of a function (at the given nodes) is in comparison with the best polynomial approximation of the function (the degree of the polynomials are fixed). The Lebesgue constant for polynomials of degree at most $n$ and for the set of $n+1$ nodes $T$ is generally denoted by $\Lambda_n(T)$. These constants are named after Henri Lebesgue.

== Definition ==
We fix the interpolation nodes $x_0, ..., x_n$and an interval $[a,\,b]$ containing all the interpolation nodes. The process of interpolation maps the function $f$ to a polynomial $p$. This defines a mapping $X$ from the space $C([a,b])$ of all continuous functions on $[a,b]$ to itself. The map $X$ is linear and it is a projection on the subspace Π_{n} of polynomials of degree n or less.

The Lebesgue constant $\Lambda_n(X)$ is defined as the operator norm of $X$. This definition requires us to specify a norm on $C([a,b])$. The uniform norm is usually the most convenient.

== Properties ==
The Lebesgue constant bounds the interpolation error: let $p^*$ denote the best approximation of $f$ among the polynomials of degree $n$ or less. In other words, $p^*$ minimizes $\|p-f\|$ among all p in Π_{n}. Then

$$\|f-X(f)\| \le (\Lambda_n(T)+1) \left \|f-p^* \right \|.$$

We will here prove this statement with the maximum norm.

$$\| f-X(f) \| \le \| f-p^* \| + \| p^* - X(f) \|$$

by the triangle inequality. But $X$ is a projection on Π_{n}, so

p^{∗} − X( f ) = X(p^{∗}) − X( f ) = X(p^{∗} − f ).

This finishes the proof since $\|X(p^*-f)\| \le \|X\| \|p^*-f\|=\|X\| \|f-p^*\|$. Note that this relation comes also as a special case of Lebesgue's lemma.

In other words, the interpolation polynomial is at most a factor Λ_{n}(T ) + 1 worse than the best possible approximation. This suggests that we look for a set of interpolation nodes with a small Lebesgue constant.

The Lebesgue constant can be expressed in terms of the Lagrange basis polynomials:

$$\ell_j(x) := \prod_{\begin{smallmatrix}i=0\\ j\neq i\end{smallmatrix}}^{n} \frac{x-x_i}{x_j-x_i}.$$

In fact, we have the Lebesgue function

$$\lambda_n(x) = \sum_{j=0}^n |\ell_j(x)|.$$

and the Lebesgue constant (or Lebesgue number) for the grid is its maximum value

$$\Lambda_n(T)=\max_{x\in[a,b]} \lambda_n(x)$$

Nevertheless, it is not easy to find an explicit expression for Λ_{n}(T ).

== Minimal Lebesgue constants ==
In the case of equidistant nodes, the Lebesgue constant grows exponentially. More precisely, we have the following asymptotic estimate

$$\Lambda_n(T) \sim \frac{2^{n+1}}{n \log n} \qquad \text{ as } n \to \infty.$$

On the other hand, the Lebesgue constant grows only logarithmically if Chebyshev nodes are used, since we have

$$\tfrac{2}{\pi} \log(n+1)+a < \Lambda_n(T) < \tfrac{2}{\pi} \log(n+1) + 1, \qquad a = 0.9625\ldots$$

We conclude again that Chebyshev nodes are a very good choice for polynomial interpolation. However, there is an easy (linear) transformation of Chebyshev nodes that gives a better Lebesgue constant. Let t_{i} denote the i-th Chebyshev node. Then, define

$$s_i = \frac{t_i}{\cos \left ( \frac{\pi}{2(n+1)} \right)}.$$

For such nodes:

$$\Lambda_n(S)<\tfrac{2}{\pi} \log(n+1)+b, \qquad b = 0.7219\ldots$$

Those nodes are, however, not optimal (i.e. they do not minimize the Lebesgue constants) and the search for an optimal set of nodes (which has already been proved to be unique under some assumptions) is still an intriguing topic in mathematics today. However, this set of nodes is optimal for interpolation over $C_M^n[-1,1]$ the set of n times differentiable functions whose n-th derivatives are bounded in absolute values by a constant M as shown by N. S. Hoang. Using a computer, one can approximate the values of the minimal Lebesgue constants, here for the canonical interval [−1, 1]:

n	1	2	3	4	5	6	7	8	9
Λ_{n}(T)	1.0000	1.2500	1.4229	1.5595	1.6722	1.7681	1.8516	1.9255	1.9917

There are uncountable infinitely many sets of nodes in [−1,1] that minimize, for fixed n > 1, the Lebesgue constant. Though if we assume that we always take −1 and 1 as nodes for interpolation (which is called a canonical node configuration), then such a set is unique and zero-symmetric. To illustrate this property, we shall see what happens when n = 2 (i.e. we consider 3 interpolation nodes in which case the property is not trivial). One can check that each set of (zero-symmetric) nodes of type (−a, 0, a) is optimal when √8/3 ≤ a ≤ 1 (we consider only nodes in [−1, 1]). If we force the set of nodes to be of the type (−1, b, 1), then b must equal 0 (look at the Lebesgue function, whose maximum is the Lebesgue constant). All arbitrary (i.e. zero-symmetric or zero-asymmetric) optimal sets of nodes in [−1,1] when n = 2 have been determined by F. Schurer, and in an alternative fashion by H.-J. Rack and R. Vajda (2014).

If we assume that we take −1 and 1 as nodes for interpolation, then as shown by H.-J. Rack (1984 and 2013), for the case n = 3, the explicit values of the optimal (unique and zero-symmetric) 4 interpolation nodes and the explicit value of the minimal Lebesgue constant are known. All arbitrary optimal sets of 4 interpolation nodes in [1,1] when n = 3 have been explicitly determined, in two different but equivalent fashions, by H.-J. Rack and R. Vajda (2015).

The Padua points provide another set of nodes with slow growth (although not as slow as the Chebyshev nodes) and with the additional property of being a unisolvent point set.

== Sensitivity of the values of a polynomial ==
The Lebesgue constants also arise in another problem. Let p(x) be a polynomial of degree n expressed in the Lagrangian form associated with the points in the vector t (i.e. the vector u of its coefficients is the vector containing the values $p(t_i)$). Let $\hat{p}(x)$ be a polynomial obtained by slightly changing the coefficients u of the original polynomial p(x) to $\hat{u}$. Consider the inequality:

$$\frac{\|p-\hat{p}\|}{\|p\|}\leq \Lambda_n(T)\frac{\|u-\hat{u}\|}{\|u\|}$$

This means that the (relative) error in the values of $\hat{p}(x)$ will not be higher than the appropriate Lebesgue constant times the relative error in the coefficients. In this sense, the Lebesgue constant can be viewed as the relative condition number of the operator mapping each coefficient vector u to the set of the values of the polynomial with coefficients u in the Lagrange form. We can actually define such an operator for each polynomial basis but its condition number is greater than the optimal Lebesgue constant for most convenient bases.
