= Wilhelm Blaschke =

Austrian mathematician (1885–1962)

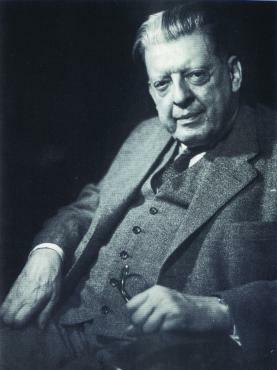
- Born: 13 September 1885; Graz, Austria-Hungary
- Died: 17 March 1962 (aged 76); Hamburg, West Germany
- Education: University of Vienna
- Known for: Blaschke product Blaschke selection theorem Blaschke–Santaló inequality
- Scientific career
- Fields: Mathematics
- Workplaces: University of Hamburg
- Doctoral advisor: Wilhelm Wirtinger
- Doctoral students: Shiing-Shen Chern; Luis Santaló; Emanuel Sperner; Gerhard Thomsen
- Other notable students: Alberto Dou Mas de Xaxàs; Erich Kähler; Wilhelm Klingenberg

Wilhelm Johann Eugen Blaschke (13 September 1885 – 17 March 1962) was an Austrian mathematician working in the fields of differential and integral geometry. In his time he was best known for his influential three-volume treatise Vorlesungen über Differentialgeometrie and later for his connection to Shiing-Shen Chern. He was a member of the Nazi Party and openly supported it.

== Biography ==
=== Early life and career ===
Blaschke was the son of mathematician Josef Blaschke (1852–1917), who taught geometry at the Landes Oberrealschule in Graz, and Maria Blaschke (1864–1945), née Edle von Mor zu Sunnegg und Morberg. After studying for two years at the Technische Hochschule in Graz, he went to the University of Vienna, and completed a doctorate in 1908 under the supervision of Wilhelm Wirtinger. His dissertation was Über eine besondere Art von Kurven vierter Klasse.

After completing his doctorate he spent several years visiting mathematicians at the major universities in Italy and Germany, including Luigi Bianchi at Pisa, Felix Klein, David Hilbert, and Carl Runge at Göttingen, Eduard Study at Bonn, and Friedrich Engel at Greifswald. He then spent two years each in positions in Prague, Leipzig, Königsberg, and Tübingen.

In 1919, he took one of the first professorships in mathematics at the newly formed University of Hamburg, along with Erich Hecke, where he remained for the rest of his career. One of his early hires to the department at Hamburg was Emil Artin. In 1922 he established the journal Abhandlungen aus dem Mathematischen Seminar der Universität Hamburg (English: Reports from the Mathematical Seminar of the University of Hamburg), which published articles in pure mathematics, including numerous contributions from famous mathematicians. He was also one of the first editors of the Springer series of textbooks Grundlehren der mathematischen Wissenschaften (English: Foundations of Mathematical Sciences). While at Hamburg, Blaschke continued to travel. He toured the United States in 1930 and 1931 as a visiting lecturer of the American Mathematical Society; his stops included the Universities of Stanford, Chicago, and Pennsylvania. In 1932 Blaschke visited China, where he lectured at Peking University. Blaschke's students at Hamburg included Shiing-Shen Chern, Luis Santaló, and Emanuel Sperner.

Blaschke married his second wife, Auguste Meta Anna Röttger (1893–1992) on 10 April 1923; they had one daughter and one son.

=== Politics and later life ===
In 1933 Blaschke signed the Vow of allegiance of the Professors of the German Universities and High-Schools to Adolf Hitler and the National Socialistic State. However, he defended Kurt Reidemeister against the Nazis and, in the early 1930s, campaigned against Ludwig Bieberbach for leadership of the German Mathematical Society, arguing that the society should remain international and apolitical in opposition to Bieberbach's wish to "enforce Nazi policies on German mathematics and race". However, by 1934 he was supporting Nazi policies, e.g., overseeing the dismissal of Max Zorn from Halle. He called himself "a Nazi at Heart", and was described by colleagues as "Mussolinetto" for his fascist beliefs. He officially joined the Nazi Party in 1937.

After the war, Blaschke was removed from his position as Dean at the University of Hamburg by the British on 3 September 1945 for his Nazi affiliation. After an appeal, against strong objections from Heinrich Behnke, and with support from Reidemeister, Constantin Caratheodory, Hans Zassenhaus, Konrad Knopp, Gustav Herglotz, and, crucially, W.V.D. Hodge, Blaschke was reinstated on 23 October 1946. He remained at the university until his retirement on 30 September 1953. Blaschke spent some time after retirement as a visiting professor in Istanbul University in 1953 and 1954.

Over the course of his career, Blaschke gained membership to numerous academic societies: The German National Academy of Sciences Leopoldina, the Austrian Academy of Sciences, the Academy of Sciences and Literature, the Bavarian Academy of Sciences and Humanities, the Saxon Academy of Sciences and Humanities in Leipzig, and the German Academy of Sciences at Berlin. He also received honorary doctorates from Sofia University, the University of Padua, the Karlsruhe Institute of Technology, and the University of Greifswald.

Blaschke died on 17 March 1962. He is buried in Ohlsdorf Cemetery.

== Publications ==
In 1916 Blaschke published one of the first books devoted to convex sets: Circle and Sphere (Kreis und Kugel). Drawing on dozens of sources, Blaschke made a thorough review of the subject with citations within the text to attribute credit in a classical area of mathematics.

- Kreis und Kugel, Leipzig, Veit 1916; 3rd edn. Berlin, de Gruyter 1956
- Vorlesungen über Differentialgeometrie, 3 vols., Springer, Grundlehren der mathematischen Wissenschaften 1921-1929 (vol. 1, Elementare Differentialgeometrie; vol. 2, Affine Differentialgeometrie; vol. 3, Differentialgeometrie der Kreise und Kugeln, 1929)
- with Gerrit Bol: Geometrie der Gewebe. Berlin: Springer 1938
- Ebene Kinematik. Leipzig: B.G. Teubner 1938, 2nd expanded edn. with Hans Robert Müller, Oldenbourg, München 1956
- Nicht-Euklidische Geometrie und Mechanik I, II, III. Leipzig: B.G.Teubner (1942)
- Zur Bewegungsgeometrie auf der Kugel. In: Sitzungsberichte der Heidelberger Akademie der Wissenschaften (1948)
- Einführung in die Differentialgeometrie. Springer 1950, 2nd expanded edn. with H. Reichardt 1960
- with Kurt Leichtweiß: Elementare Differentialgeometrie. Berlin: Springer (5th edn. 1973)
- Reden und Reisen eines Geometers. Berlin : VEB Deutscher Verlag der Wissenschaften (1961; 2nd expanded edn.)
- Mathematik und Leben, Wiesbaden, Steiner 1951
- Griechische und anschauliche Geometrie, Oldenbourg 1953
- Projektive Geometrie, 3rd edn, Birkhäuser 1954
- Analytische Geometrie, 2nd edn., Birkhäuser 1954
- Einführung in die Geometrie der Waben, Birkhäuser 1955
- Vorlesungen über Integralgeometrie, VEB, Berlin 1955
- Reden und Reisen eines Geometers, 1957
- Kinematik und Quaternionen. Berlin: VEB Deutscher Verlag der Wissenschaften (1960)
- Gesammelte Werke, Thales-Verlag, Essen 1982 vol. 1 ISBN 3889082017; 1985 vol. 2 ISBN 3889082025; 1985 vol. 3 ISBN 3889082033

== Mathematics ==
Several theorems and mathematical concepts are named for Blaschke:

- Blaschke selection theorem – Sequences of convex sets in a bounded set have convergent subsequences
- Blaschke–Lebesgue theorem – On least area of curves of constant width
- Blaschke product – Analytic function with prescribed zeros, for points in a unit disk satisfying the Blaschke condition
- Blaschke sum – Polytope combining two smaller polytopes
- Blaschke–Busemann measure – Generalization of Riemannian metrics on surfaces
- Blaschke–Santaló inequality – On the Mahler volumes of centrally symmetric convex bodies
- Blaschke conjecture – That the only manifold where all geodesics through any point pass through a second point is the Euclidean sphere

== Legacy ==
The Wilhelm Blaschke Memorial Foundation of Hamburg, founded by Emanuel Sperner, awards the Wilhelm Blaschke Medal at irregular intervals for outstanding achievements in geometry. Recipients include Kurt Leichtweiss, Katsumi Nomizu, and S.S. Chern.

== See also ==
- Affine differential geometry
- Affine geometry of curves
- Body of constant brightness
- Web (differential geometry)
- Pestov–Ionin theorem
