= Blaschke selection theorem =

Sequences of convex sets in a bounded set have convergent subsequences

The Blaschke selection theorem is a result in topology and convex geometry about sequences of convex sets. Specifically, given a sequence $\{K_n\}$ of convex sets contained in a bounded set, the theorem guarantees the existence of a subsequence $\{K_{n_m}\}$ and a convex set $K$ such that $K_{n_m}$ converges to $K$ in the Hausdorff metric. The theorem is named for Wilhelm Blaschke.

== Alternate statements ==
- A succinct statement of the theorem is that the metric space of convex bodies is locally compact.
- Using the Hausdorff metric on sets, every infinite collection of compact subsets of the unit ball has a limit point (and that limit point is itself a compact set).

== Application ==
As an example of its use, the isoperimetric problem can be shown to have a solution. That is, there exists a curve of fixed length that encloses the maximum area possible. Other problems likewise can be shown to have a solution:

- Lebesgue's universal covering problem for a convex universal cover of minimal size for the collection of all sets in the plane of unit diameter,
- the maximum inclusion problem,
- and the Moser's worm problem for a convex universal cover of minimal size for the collection of planar curves of unit length.
