= Birkhoff interpolation =

In mathematics, Birkhoff interpolation is an extension of polynomial interpolation. It refers to the problem of finding a polynomial $P(x)$ of degree $d$ such that only certain derivatives have specified values at specified points:

$$P^{(n_i)}(x_i) = y_i \qquad\mbox{for } i=1,\ldots,d,$$

where the data points $(x_i,y_i)$ and the nonnegative integers $n_i$ are given. It differs from Hermite interpolation in that it is possible to specify derivatives of $P(x)$ at some points without specifying the lower derivatives or the polynomial itself. The name refers to George David Birkhoff, who first studied the problem in 1906.

== Existence and uniqueness of solutions ==
In contrast to Lagrange interpolation and Hermite interpolation, a Birkhoff interpolation problem does not always have a unique solution. For instance, there is no quadratic polynomial $P(x)$ such that $P(-1)=P(1)=0$ and $P^{(1)}(0)=1$. On the other hand, the Birkhoff interpolation problem where the values of $P^{(1)}(-1), P(0)$ and $P^{(1)}(1)$ are given always has a unique solution.

An important problem in the theory of Birkhoff interpolation is to classify those problems that have a unique solution. Schoenberg formulates the problem as follows. Let $d$ denote the number of conditions (as above) and let $k$ be the number of interpolation points. Given a $d\times k$ matrix $E$, all of whose entries are either $0$ or $1$, such that exactly $d$ entries are $1$, then the corresponding problem is to determine $P(x)$ such that

$$P^{(j)}(x_i) = y_{i,j} \qquad\forall (i,j) / e_{ij} = 1$$

The matrix $E$ is called the incidence matrix. For example, the incidence matrices for the interpolation problems mentioned in the previous paragraph are:

$$\begin{pmatrix} 1 & 0 & 0 \\ 0 & 1 & 0 \\ 1 & 0 & 0 \end{pmatrix} \qquad\mathrm{and}\qquad \begin{pmatrix} 0 & 1 & 0 \\ 1 & 0 & 0 \\ 0 & 1 & 0 \end{pmatrix}.$$

Now the question is: Does a Birkhoff interpolation problem with a given incidence matrix $E$ have a unique solution for any choice of the interpolation points?

The case with $k=2$ interpolation points was tackled by George Pólya in 1931. Let $S_m$ denote the sum of the entries in the first $m$ columns of the incidence matrix:

$$S_m = \sum_{i=1}^k \sum_{j=1}^m e_{ij}.$$

Then the Birkhoff interpolation problem with $k=2$ has a unique solution if and only if $S_m\geqslant m \quad\forall m$. Schoenberg showed that this is a necessary condition for all values of $k$.

== Some examples ==
Consider a differentiable function $f(x)$ on $[a,b]$, such that $f(a)=f(b)$. Let us see that there is no Birkhoff interpolation quadratic polynomial such that $P^{(1)}(c)=f^{(1)}(c)$ where $c=\frac{a+b}{2}$: Since $f(a)=f(b)$, one may write the polynomial as $P(x)=A(x-c)^2+B$ (by completing the square) where $A,B$ are merely the interpolation coefficients. The derivative of the interpolation polynomial is given by $P^{(1)}(x)=2A(x-c)^2$. This implies $P^{(1)}(c)=0$, however this is absurd, since $f^{(1)}(c)$ is not necessarily $0$. The incidence matrix is given by:

$$\begin{pmatrix} 1 & 0 & 0 \\ 0 & 1 & 0 \\ 1 & 0 & 0 \end{pmatrix}_{3\times3}$$

Consider a differentiable function $f(x)$ on $[a,b]$, and denote $x_0=a,x_2=b$ with $x_1\in[a,b]$. Let us see that there is indeed Birkhoff interpolation quadratic polynomial such that $P(x_1)=f(x_1)$ and $P^{(1)}(x_0)=f^{(1)}(x_0),P^{(1)}(x_2)=f^{(1)}(x_2)$. Construct the interpolating polynomial of $f^{(1)}(x)$ at the nodes $x_0,x_2$, such that $\displaystyle P_1(x) = \frac{f^{(1)}(x_2)-f^{(1)}(x_0)}{x_2-x_0}(x-x_0)+f^{(1)}(x_0)$. Thus the polynomial : $\displaystyle P_2(x) = f(x_1) + \int_{x_1}^x\!P_1(t)\;\mathrm{d}t$ is the Birkhoff interpolating polynomial. The incidence matrix is given by:

$$\begin{pmatrix} 0 & 1 & 0 \\ 1 & 0 & 0 \\ 0 & 1 & 0 \end{pmatrix}_{3\times3}$$

Given a natural number $N$, and a differentiable function $f(x)$ on $[a,b]$, is there a polynomial such that: $P(x_0)=f(x_0)$ and $P^{(1)}(x_i)=f^{(1)}(x_i)$ for $i=1,\cdots,N$ with $x_0,x_1,\cdots,x_N\in[a,b]$? Construct the Lagrange/Newton polynomial (same interpolating polynomial, different form to calculate and express them) $P_{N-1}(x)$ that satisfies $P_{N-1}(x_i)=f^{(1)}(x_i)$ for $i=1,\cdots,N$, then the polynomial $\displaystyle P_N(x) = f(x_0) + \int_{x_0}^x\! P_{N-1}(t)\;\mathrm{d}t$ is the Birkhoff interpolating polynomial satisfying the above conditions. The incidence matrix is given by:

$$\begin{pmatrix} 1 & 0 & 0 & \cdots & 0 \\ 0 & 1 & 0 & \cdots & 0 \\ \vdots & \vdots & \vdots & \ddots & \vdots \\ 0 & 1 & 0 & \cdots & 0 \\ \end{pmatrix}_{N\times N}$$

Given a natural number $N$, and a $2N$ differentiable function $f(x)$ on $[a,b]$, is there a polynomial such that: $P^{(k)}(a)=f^{(k)}(a)$ and $P^{(k)}(b)=f^{(k)}(b)$ for $k=0,2,\cdots,2N$? Construct $P_1(x)$ as the interpolating polynomial of $f(x)$ at $x=a$ and $x=b$, such that $P_1(x)=\frac{f^{(2N)}(b)-f^{(2N)}(a)}{b-a}(x-a) +f^{(2N)}(a)$. Define then the iterates $\displaystyle P_{k+2}(x)=\frac{f^{(2N-2k)}(b)-f^{(2N-2k)}(a)}{b-a}(x-a) +f^{(2N-2k)}(a) + \int_a^x\!\int_a^t\! P_k(s)\;\mathrm{d}s\;\mathrm{d}t$ . Then $P_{2N+1}(x)$ is the Birkhoff interpolating polynomial. The incidence matrix is given by:

$$\begin{pmatrix} 1 & 0 & 1 & 0 \cdots \\ 1 & 0 & 1 & 0 \cdots \\ \end{pmatrix}_{2\times N}$$
