= Lebesgue's universal covering problem =

Unsolved geometry problem

An equilateral triangle of diameter 1 doesn’t fit inside a circle of diameter 1

Lebesgue's universal covering problem is an unsolved problem in geometry that asks for the convex shape of smallest area that can cover every planar set of diameter one. The diameter of a set by definition is the least upper bound of the distances between all pairs of points in the set. A shape covers a set if it contains a congruent subset. In other words the set may be rotated, translated or reflected to fit inside the shape.

Unsolved problem in mathematics:
What is the minimum area of a convex shape that can cover every planar set of diameter one?
(more unsolved problems in mathematics)

== Formulation and early research ==
The problem was posed by Henri Lebesgue in a letter to Gyula Pál in 1914. It was published in a paper by Pál in 1920 along with Pál's analysis. He showed that a cover for all curves of constant width one is also a cover for all sets of diameter one and that a cover can be constructed by taking a regular hexagon with an inscribed circle of diameter one and removing two corners from the hexagon to give a cover of area $2-\frac{2}{\sqrt3}\approx 0.84529946.$

The shape outlined in black is Pál's solution to Lebesgue's universal covering problem. Within it, planar shapes with diameter one have been included: a circle (in blue), a Reuleaux triangle (in red) and a square (in green).

In 1936, Roland Sprague showed that a part of Pál's cover could be removed near one of the other corners while still retaining its property as a cover. This reduced the upper bound on the area to $a \le 0.844137708436$.

== Current bounds ==
After a sequence of improvements to Sprague's solution, each removing small corners from the solution, a 2018 preprint of Philip Gibbs claimed the best upper bound known, a further reduction to area 0.8440935944.

The best known lower bound for the area was provided by Peter Brass and Mehrbod Sharifi using a combination of three shapes in optimal alignment, proving that the area of an optimal cover is at least 0.832.

== See also ==
- Moser's worm problem, what is the minimum area of a shape that can cover every unit-length curve?
- Moving sofa problem, the problem of finding a maximum-area shape that can be rotated and translated through an L-shaped corridor
- Kakeya set, a set of minimal area that can accommodate every unit-length line segment (with translations allowed, but not rotations)
- Blaschke selection theorem, which can be used to prove that Lebesgue's universal covering problem has a solution.
