= Moser's worm problem =

Unsolved geometry problem about planar regions

Unsolved problem in mathematics
What is the minimum area of a shape that can cover every unit-length curve?
More unsolved problems in mathematics

Some possible bounds to the Moser's worm problem: 1. / An upper bound is a disc of diameter equal to the length of the worm.; 2. / By symmetry, half the disc is sufficient.; 3. / The cover must support a width at least the worm's length divided by π; 4. / A solution by John E. Wetzel.

Moser's worm problem (also known as mother worm's blanket problem) is an unsolved problem in geometry formulated by the Austrian-Canadian mathematician Leo Moser in 1966. The problem asks for the region of smallest area that can accommodate every plane curve of length 1. Here "accommodate" means that the curve may be rotated and translated to fit inside the region. In some variations of the problem, the region is restricted to be convex.

== Examples ==
For example, a circular disk of radius 1/2 can accommodate any plane curve of length 1 by placing the midpoint of the curve at the center of the disk. Another possible solution has the shape of a rhombus with vertex angles of 60° and 120° and with a long diagonal of unit length. However, these are not optimal solutions; other shapes are known that solve the problem with smaller areas.

== Solution properties ==
It is not completely trivial that a minimum-area cover exists. An alternative possibility would be that there is some minimal area that can be approached but not actually attained. However, there does exist a smallest convex cover. Its existence follows from the Blaschke selection theorem.

It is also not trivial to determine whether a given shape forms a cover. Gerriets & Poole (1974) conjectured that a shape accommodates every unit-length curve if and only if it accommodates every unit-length polygonal chain with three segments, a more easily tested condition, but Panraksa, Wetzel & Wichiramala (2007) showed that no finite bound on the number of segments in a polychain would suffice for this test.

== Known bounds ==
The problem remains open, but over a series of papers, researchers have tightened the gap between the known lower and upper bounds. In particular, Norwood & Poole (2003) constructed a (nonconvex) universal cover and showed that the minimum shape has area at most 0.260437; Gerriets & Poole (1974) and Norwood, Poole & Laidacker (1992) gave weaker upper bounds. In the convex case, Wang (2006) improved an upper bound to 0.270911861. Khandhawit, Pagonakis & Sriswasdi (2013) used a min-max strategy for the area of a convex set containing a segment, a triangle, and a rectangle to show a lower bound of 0.232239 for a convex cover.

In the 1970s, John Wetzel conjectured that a 30° circular sector of unit radius is a cover with area $\pi/12 \approx 0.2618$. This conjecture was partially proved for "drapeable" unit arcs in Movshovich & Wetzel (2017); it was finally settled in general by Panraksa & Wichiramala (2021). This improves the upper bound for the convex cover by about 3%.

== See also ==
- Moving sofa problem, the problem of finding a maximum-area shape that can be rotated and translated through an L-shaped corridor
- Kakeya set, a set of minimal area that can accommodate every unit-length line segment (with translations allowed, but not rotations)
- Lebesgue's universal covering problem, find the smallest convex area that can cover any planar set of unit diameter
- Bellman's lost-in-a-forest problem, find the shortest path to escape from a forest of known size and shape.
