= Dan Romik =

Mathematician

Dan Romik (Hebrew: דן רומיק) is a mathematician and a professor of mathematics at the University of California, Davis. He is known for contributions to probability theory and discrete mathematics.

== Biography and Career ==
Romik received his Ph.D. from Tel Aviv University in 2002 under the supervision of David Gilat. He has worked at the University of California, Davis since 2009. He is an author of 3 books and over 40 papers, including publications in the Annals of Mathematics and in the Proceedings of the National Academy of Sciences. In 2010 he was awarded a National Science Foundation CAREER Award, and he was a Simons Fellow in 2012. From 2014 to 2017 he was the chair of the Mathematics Department of the University of California, Davis.

Much of Romik's work is in the areas of algebraic and enumerative combinatorics. He was an invited speaker at the FPSAC 2017 and AofA 2017 conferences and served as co-chair of the FPSAC 2021 program committee.

== Work ==
=== The sphere packing problem ===
In 2023, Romik published a paper simplifying Maryna Viazovska's solution to the sphere packing problem in dimension 8. Viazovska's original solution relied on computer calculations to verify analytical inequalities that were an essential ingredient in her proof, making the proof a computer-assisted proof. Romik's paper presents a proof of the same inequalities that does not rely on computer calculations.

=== The moving sofa problem ===
Romik's research work on the moving sofa problem has been featured on the Numberphile educational YouTube channel, in an article in Popular Mechanics, and in several other news publications and websites.

=== Software ===
Romik developed several software packages accompanying his research articles. He is the creator of the MadHat software system for mathematical typesetting and publishing.

== Selected publications ==
=== Books ===
- Romik, Dan (2015). The Surprising Mathematics of Longest Increasing Subsequences. Cambridge University Press. doi:10.1017/CBO9781139872003. ISBN 978-1-139-87200-3.
- Romik, Dan (2015). Topics in Complex Analysis. De Gruyter. doi:10.1515/9783110796810. ISBN 978-3-11-079681-0.
- Romik, Dan (2023). An Invitation to MadHat and Mathematical Typesetting. Association for Mathematical Research, to appear.

=== Journal articles ===
- Romik, Dan (2023). "On Viazovska's modular form inequalities". Proceedings of the National Academy of Sciences of the United States of America. 120 (43) e2304891120. arXiv:2303.13427. doi:10.1073/pnas.2304891120. PMC 10614599. PMID 37851677. S2CID 257687204.
- Chatterjee, Sourav; Peled, Ron; Peres, Yuval; Romik, Dan (2010). "Gravitational allocation to Poisson points". Annals of Mathematics. 172: 617–671. arXiv:math/0611886. doi:10.4007/annals.2010.172.617.
- Kallus, Yoav; Romik, Dan (2018). "Improved upper bounds in the moving sofa problem". Advances in Mathematics. 340: 960–982. arXiv:1706.06630. doi:10.1016/j.aim.2018.10.022.
- Bufetov, Alexey; Gorin, Vadim; Romik, Dan (2022). "Absorbing time asymptotics in the oriented swap process". Annals of Applied Probability. 32 (2): 753–763. arXiv:2003.06479. doi:10.1214/21-aap1695. S2CID 212725060.
- Angel, Omer; Holroyd, Alexander; Romik, Dan (2009). "The oriented swap process". Annals of Probability. 37 (5): 1970–1998. arXiv:0806.2222. doi:10.1214/09-AOP456.
