= Fatou–Lebesgue theorem =

Theorem in measure theory

In mathematics, the Fatou–Lebesgue theorem establishes a chain of inequalities relating the integrals (in the sense of Lebesgue) of the limit inferior and the limit superior of a sequence of functions to the limit inferior and the limit superior of integrals of these functions. The theorem is named after Pierre Fatou and Henri Léon Lebesgue.

If the sequence of functions converges pointwise, the inequalities turn into equalities and the theorem reduces to Lebesgue's dominated convergence theorem.

== Statement of the theorem ==
Let f_{1}, f_{2}, ... denote a sequence of real-valued measurable functions defined on a measure space (S,Σ,μ). If there exists a Lebesgue-integrable function g on S which dominates the sequence in absolute value, meaning that |f_{n}| ≤ g for all natural numbers n, then all f_{n} as well as the limit inferior and the limit superior of the f_{n} are integrable and

$$\int_S \liminf_{n\to\infty} f_n\,d\mu
\le \liminf_{n\to\infty} \int_S f_n\,d\mu
\le \limsup_{n\to\infty} \int_S f_n\,d\mu
\le \int_S \limsup_{n\to\infty} f_n\,d\mu\,.$$

Here the limit inferior and the limit superior of the f_{n} are taken pointwise. The integral of the absolute value of these limiting functions is bounded above by the integral of g.

Since the middle inequality (for sequences of real numbers) is always true, the directions of the other inequalities are easy to remember.

== Proof ==
All f_{n} as well as the limit inferior and the limit superior of the f_{n} are measurable and dominated in absolute value by g, hence integrable.

Using linearity of the Lebesgue integral and applying Fatou's lemma to the non-negative functions $f_n + g$ we get
$$\int_X \liminf_{n \to\infty} f_n \,d\mu + \int_X g \,d\mu = \int_X \liminf_{n \to \infty} (f_n + g) \le \liminf_{n \to \infty} \int_X (f_n + g) \, d\mu =\liminf_{n \to \infty} \int_X f_n \,d\mu + \int_X g \, d\mu.$$
Cancelling the finite(!) $\int_X g \,d\mu$ term we get the first inequality. The second inequality is the elementary inequality between $\liminf$ and $\limsup$. The last inequality follows by applying reverse Fatou lemma, i.e. applying the Fatou lemma to the non-negative functions $g-f_n$, and again (up to sign) cancelling the finite $\int_X g \,d\mu$ term.

Finally, since $\limsup_n |f_n| \le g$,

$$\max\left(\left|\int_S \liminf_{n\to\infty} f_n\,d\mu\right|
,  \left|\int_S \limsup_{n\to\infty} f_n\,d\mu\right|
\right) \le\int_S \max\left(\left|\liminf_{n\to\infty} f_n\right|, \left|\limsup_{n\to \infty} f_n\right|\right)\, d\mu
\le\int_S \limsup_{n\to\infty} |f_n|\,d\mu
\le\int_S g\,d\mu$$

by the monotonicity of the Lebesgue integral.

== See also ==
- Topics in Real Analysis by Gerald Teschl, University of Vienna.
