= Walsh–Lebesgue theorem =

The Walsh–Lebesgue theorem is a famous result from harmonic analysis proved by the American mathematician Joseph L. Walsh in 1929, using results proved by Lebesgue in 1907. The theorem states the following:

Let K be a compact subset of the Euclidean plane $\mathbb{R}^2$ such the relative complement of $K$ with respect to $\mathbb{R}^2$ is connected. Then, every real-valued continuous function on $\partial{K}$ (i.e. the boundary of K) can be approximated uniformly on $\partial{K}$ by (real-valued) harmonic polynomials in the real variables x and y.

== Generalizations ==
The Walsh–Lebesgue theorem has been generalized to Riemann surfaces and to $\mathbb{R}^n$ (real coordinate space).

This Walsh-Lebesgue theorem has also served as a catalyst for entire chapters in the theory of function algebras such as the theory of Dirichlet algebras and logmodular algebras.

In 1974 Anthony G. O'Farrell gave a generalization of the Walsh–Lebesgue theorem by means of the 1964 Browder–Wermer theorem with related techniques.
