= Lebesgue spine =

In mathematics, in the area of potential theory, a Lebesgue spine or Lebesgue thorn is a type of set used for discussing solutions to the Dirichlet problem and related problems of potential theory. The Lebesgue spine was introduced in 1912 by Henri Lebesgue to demonstrate that the Dirichlet problem does not always have a solution, particularly when the boundary has a sufficiently sharp edge protruding into the interior of the region.

== Definition ==
A typical Lebesgue spine in $\R^n$, for $n\ge 3,$ is defined as follows

$$S = \{(x_1,x_2,\dots,x_n)\in\R^n : x_n>0, x_1^2+x_2^2+\cdots
+x_{n-1}^2 \le \exp(-1/x_n^2) \}.$$

The important features of this set are that it is connected and path-connected in the euclidean topology in $\R^n$ and the origin is a limit point of the set, and yet the set is thin at the origin, as defined in the article Fine topology (potential theory).

== Observations ==
The set $S$ is not closed in the euclidean topology since it does not contain the origin which is a limit point of $S$, but the set is closed in the fine topology in $\R^n$.

In comparison, it is not possible in $\R^2$ to construct such a connected set which is thin at the origin.
