= Riemann–Lebesgue lemma =

Theorem in harmonic analysis

In mathematics, the Riemann–Lebesgue lemma, named after Bernhard Riemann and Henri Lebesgue, states that the Fourier transform or Laplace transform of an L^{1} function vanishes at infinity. It is of importance in harmonic analysis and asymptotic analysis.

== Statement ==
Let $f\in L^1(\R^n)$ be an integrable function, i.e. $f\colon\R^n \rightarrow \C$ is a measurable function such that

$$\|f\|_{L^1} = \int_{\R^n} |f(x)| \mathrm{d}x < \infty,$$

and let $\hat{f}$ be the Fourier transform of $f$, i.e.

$$\hat{f}\colon\R^n \rightarrow \C, \ \xi\mapsto \int_{\R^n} f(x) \mathrm{e}^{-\mathrm{i}x\cdot\xi}\mathrm{d}x.$$

Then $\hat{f}$ vanishes at infinity: $|\hat{f}(\xi)| \to 0$ as $|\xi| \to\infty$.

Because the Fourier transform of an integrable function is continuous, the Fourier transform $\hat{f}$ is a continuous function vanishing at infinity. If $C_0(\R^n)$ denotes the vector space of continuous functions vanishing at infinity, the Riemann–Lebesgue lemma may be formulated as follows: The Fourier transformation maps $L^1(\R^n)$ to $C_0(\R^n)$.

=== Proof ===
We will focus on the one-dimensional case $n=1$, the proof in higher dimensions is similar. First, suppose that $f$ is continuous and compactly supported. For $\xi \neq 0$, the substitution $\textstyle x\to x+\frac{\pi}{\xi}$ leads to

$$\hat{f}(\xi) = \int_{\R} f(x) \mathrm{e}^{-\mathrm{i}x\xi}\mathrm{d}x = \int_{\R} f\left(x+\frac{\pi}{\xi}\right) \mathrm{e}^{-\mathrm{i}x\xi} \mathrm{e}^{-\mathrm{i}\pi} \mathrm{d}x = -\int_{\R} f\left(x+\frac{\pi}{\xi}\right) \mathrm{e}^{-\mathrm{i}x\xi} \mathrm{d}x$$.

This gives a second formula for $\hat{f}(\xi)$. Taking the mean of both formulas, we arrive at the following estimate:

$$|\hat{f}(\xi)|\le \frac{1}{2}\int_{\R} \left|f(x)-f\left(x+\frac{\pi}{\xi}\right)\right|\mathrm{d}x$$.

When $f$ is continuous, $\left|f(x)-f\left(x+\tfrac{\pi}{\xi}\right)\right|$ converges to $0$ as $|\xi| \to \infty$ for all $x \in \R$. Thus, $|\hat{f}(\xi)|$ converges to 0 as $|\xi| \to \infty$ due to the dominated convergence theorem.

Now, if $f$ is an arbitrary integrable function, it may be approximated in the $L^1$ norm by a compactly supported continuous function. For $\varepsilon > 0$, pick a compactly supported continuous function $g$ such that $\|f-g\|_{L^1} \leq \varepsilon$. Then

$$\limsup_{\xi\rightarrow\pm\infty} |\hat{f}(\xi)| \leq  \limsup_{\xi\to\pm\infty}  \left|\int (f(x)-g(x))\mathrm{e}^{-\mathrm{i}x\xi} \, \mathrm{d}x\right| + \limsup_{\xi\rightarrow\pm\infty}  \left|\int g(x)\mathrm{e}^{-\mathrm{i}x\xi} \, \mathrm{d}x\right| \leq \varepsilon + 0 = \varepsilon.$$

Since $g$ is continuous, we have $\hat{g}\to 0$, because of RL lemma shown above for continuous functions. Because this holds for any $\varepsilon > 0$, it follows that $|\hat{f}(\xi)| \to 0$ as $|\xi| \to\infty$.

== Other versions ==
The Riemann–Lebesgue lemma holds in a variety of other situations.

- If $f \in L^1[0,\infty)$, then the Riemann–Lebesgue lemma also holds for the Laplace transform of $f$, that is,

$$\int_0^\infty f(t) \mathrm{e}^{-tz} \mathrm{d}t \to 0$$

as $|z| \to \infty$ within the half-plane $\mathrm{Re}(z) \geq 0$.

- A version holds for Fourier series as well: if $f$ is an integrable function on a bounded interval, then the Fourier coefficients $\hat{f}_k$ of $f$ tend to 0 as $k \to \pm \infty$. This follows by extending $f$ by zero outside the interval, and then applying the version of the Riemann–Lebesgue lemma on the entire real line.
- However, the Riemann–Lebesgue lemma does not hold for arbitrary distributions. For example, the Dirac delta function distribution formally has a finite integral over the real line, but its Fourier transform is a constant and does not vanish at infinity.

== Applications ==
The Riemann–Lebesgue lemma can be used to prove the validity of asymptotic approximations for integrals. Rigorous treatments of the method of steepest descent and the method of stationary phase, amongst others, are based on the Riemann–Lebesgue lemma.
