= Moving sofa problem =

On areas of shapes in 2d motion planning

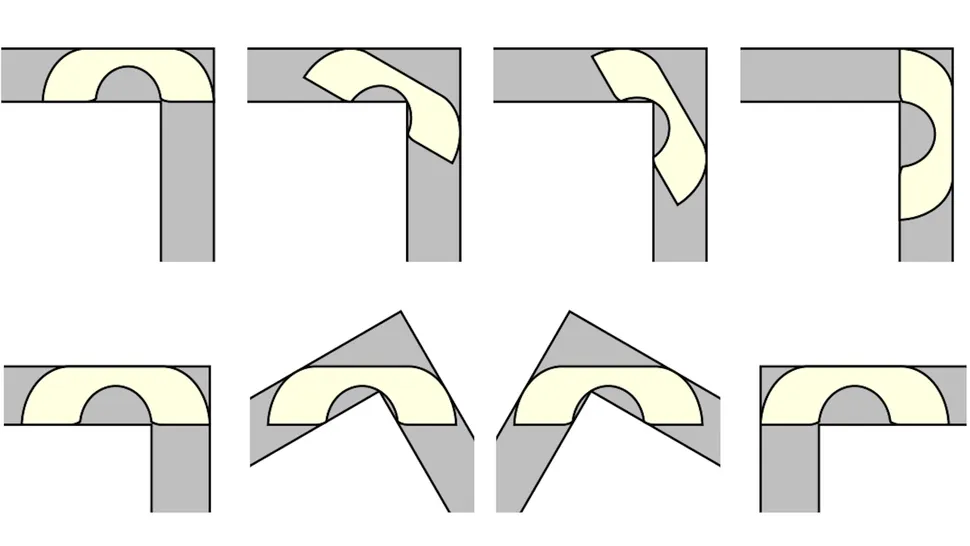
Diagram of the moving sofa problem

Unsolved problem in mathematics
What is the largest area of a shape that can be maneuvered through a unit-width L-shaped corridor?
More unsolved problems in mathematics

In mathematics, the moving sofa problem or sofa problem is a two-dimensional idealization of real-life furniture-moving problems and asks for the rigid two-dimensional shape of the largest area that can be maneuvered through an L-shaped planar region with legs of unit width. The area thus obtained is referred to as the sofa constant. The exact value of the sofa constant is an open problem.

The leading solution, by Joseph L. Gerver, has a value of approximately 2.2195. In November 2024, Jineon Baek posted a 119-page arXiv preprint claiming that Gerver's value is optimal, which if true would solve the moving sofa problem.

== History ==
The first formal publication was by the Austrian-Canadian mathematician Leo Moser in 1966, although there had been many informal mentions before that date.

== Bounds ==
Work has been done to prove that the sofa constant $A$ cannot be below or above specific values (lower bounds and upper bounds).

=== Lower ===
The Hammersley sofa has an area of 2.2074, but is not the largest solution

Gerver's sofa of area 2.2195 with 18 curve sections

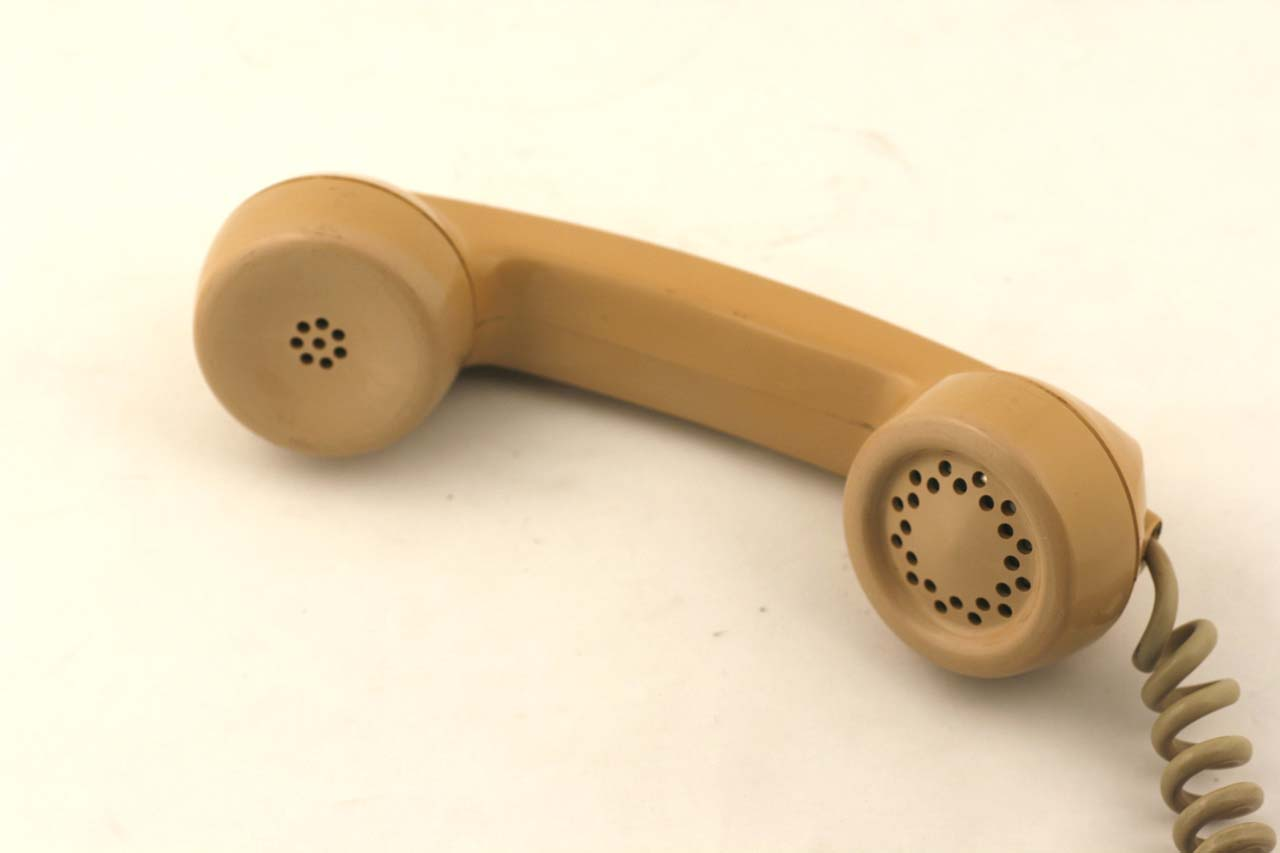
A telephone handset, a closer match than a sofa to Gerver's shape

A lower bound on the sofa constant can be proven by finding a specific shape with a high area and a path for moving it through the corner. $A \geq \pi/2 \approx 1.57$ is an obvious lower bound. This comes from a sofa that is a half-disk of unit radius, which can slide up one passage into the corner, rotate within the corner around the center of the disk, and then slide out the other passage.

In 1968, John Hammersley stated a lower bound of $A \geq \pi/2 + 2/\pi \approx 2.2074$. This can be achieved using a shape resembling an old-fashioned telephone handset, consisting of two quarter-disks of radius 1 on either side of a 1 by $4/\pi$ rectangle from which a half-disk of radius $2/\pi$ has been removed.

In 1992, Joseph L. Gerver of Rutgers University described a sofa with 18 curve sections, each taking a smooth analytic form. This further increased the lower bound for the sofa constant to approximately 2.2195 (sequence A128463 in the OEIS).

Overlap of Hammersley’s sofa (red) and Gerver’s sofa (blue).

=== Upper ===
Hammersley stated an upper bound on the sofa constant of at most $2\sqrt{2} \approx 2.8284$. Yoav Kallus and Dan Romik published a new upper bound in 2018, capping the sofa constant at $2.37$. Their approach involves rotating the corridor (rather than the sofa) through a finite sequence of distinct angles (rather than continuously) and using a computer search to find translations for each rotated copy so that the intersection of all of the copies has a connected component with as large an area as possible. As they show, this provides a valid upper bound for the optimal sofa, which can be made more accurate using more rotation angles. Five carefully chosen rotation angles lead to the stated upper bound.

== Ambidextrous sofa ==
Romik's ambidextrous sofa

A variant of the sofa problem asks the shape of the largest area that can go around both left and right 90-degree corners in a corridor of unit width (where the left and right corners are spaced sufficiently far apart that one is fully negotiated before the other is encountered). A lower bound of area approximately 1.64495521 has been described by Dan Romik. 18 curve sections also describe his sofa.

== See also ==
- Dirk Gently's Holistic Detective Agency – A novel by Douglas Adams, with a subplot that revolves around such a problem.
- Moser's worm problem – Unsolved geometry problem about planar regions
- Square packing in a square – Two-dimensional packing problem
- "The One with the Cop" – An episode of the American TV series Friends with a subplot pivoting around such a problem.
