= Lebesgue's number lemma =

Given a cover of a compact metric space, all small subsets are subset of some cover set

In topology, the Lebesgue covering lemma is a useful tool in the study of compact metric spaces.

Given an open cover of a compact metric space $X$, a Lebesgue's number of the cover is a number $\delta > 0$ such that every subset of $X$ having diameter less than $\delta$ is contained in some member of the cover.

The existence of Lebesgue's numbers for compact metric spaces is given by the Lebesgue's covering lemma:

If the metric space $(X, d)$ is compact and an open cover of $X$ is given, then the cover admits some Lebesgue's number $\delta > 0$.

The notion of Lebesgue's numbers itself is useful in other applications as well.

== Proof ==
=== Direct proof ===
Let $\mathcal U$ be an open cover of $X$. Since $X$ is compact we can extract a finite subcover $\{A_1, \dots, A_n\} \subseteq \mathcal U$. If any one of the $A_i$'s equals $X$ then any $\delta > 0$ will serve as a Lebesgue's number. Otherwise for each $i \in \{1, \dots, n\}$, let $C_i := X \setminus A_i$, note that $C_i$ is not empty, and define a function $f : X \rightarrow \mathbb R$ by

$$f(x) := \frac{1}{n} \sum_{i=1}^n d(x,C_i).$$

Since $f$ is continuous on a compact set, it attains a minimum $\delta$. The key observation is that, since every $x$ is contained in some $A_i$, the extreme value theorem shows $\delta > 0$. Now we can verify that this $\delta$ is the desired Lebesgue's number. If $Y$ is a subset of $X$ of diameter less than $\delta$, choose $x_0$ as any point in $Y$, then by definition of diameter, $Y\subseteq B_\delta(x_0)$, where $B_\delta(x_0)$ denotes the ball of radius $\delta$ centered at $x_0$. Since $f(x_0)\geq \delta$ there must exist at least one $i$ such that $d(x_0,C_i)\geq \delta$. But this means that $B_\delta(x_0)\subseteq A_i$ and so, in particular, $Y\subseteq A_i$.

=== Proof by contradiction ===
Suppose for contradiction that $X$ is sequentially compact, $\{ U_{\alpha} \mid \alpha \in J \}$ is an open cover of $X$, and the Lebesgue number $\delta$ does not exist. That is: for all $\delta > 0$, there exists $A \subset X$ with $\operatorname{diam} (A) < \delta$ such that there does not exist $\beta \in J$ with $A \subset U_{\beta}$.

This enables us to perform the following construction:

$\delta_{1} = 1, \quad \exists A_{1} \subset X \quad \text{where} \quad \operatorname{diam} (A_{1}) < \delta_{1} \quad \text {and} \quad \neg\exists \beta (A_{1} \subset U_{\beta})$
$\delta_{2} = \frac{1}{2}, \quad \exists A_{2} \subset X \quad \text{where} \quad \operatorname{diam} (A_{2}) < \delta_{2} \quad \text{and} \quad \neg\exists \beta (A_{2} \subset U_{\beta})$
$\vdots$
$\delta_{k}=\frac{1}{k}, \quad \exists A_{k} \subset X \quad \text{where} \quad \operatorname{diam} (A_{k}) < \delta_{k} \quad \text{and} \quad \neg\exists \beta (A_{k} \subset U_{\beta})$
$\vdots$

Note that $A_{n} \neq \emptyset$ for all $n \in \mathbb{Z}^{+}$, since $A_{n} \not\subset U_{\beta}$. It is therefore possible by the axiom of choice to construct a sequence $(x_{n})$ in which $x_{i} \in A_{i}$ for each $i$. Since $X$ is sequentially compact, there exists a subsequence $\{x_{n_{k}}\}$ (with $k \in \mathbb{Z}_{> 0}$) that converges to $x_{0}$.

Because $\{ U_{\alpha} \}$ is an open cover, there exists some $\alpha_{0} \in J$ such that $x_{0} \in U_{\alpha_{0}}$. As $U_{\alpha_{0}}$ is open, there exists $r > 0$ with $B_{r}(x_{0}) \subset U_{\alpha_{0}}$. Now we invoke the convergence of the subsequence $\{ x_{n_{k}} \}$: there exists $L \in \mathbb{Z}^{+}$ such that $L \le k$ implies $x_{n_{k}} \in B_{r/2} (x_{0})$.

Furthermore, there exists $M \in \mathbb{Z}_{> 0}$ such that $\delta_{M}= \tfrac{1}{M} < \tfrac{r}{2}$. Hence for all $z \in \mathbb{Z}_{> 0}$, we have $M \le z$ implies $\operatorname{diam} (A_{M}) < \tfrac{r}{2}$.

Finally, define $q \in \mathbb{Z}_{> 0}$ such that $n_{q} \geq M$ and $q \geq L$. For all $x' \in A_{n_{q}}$, notice that:

- $d(x_{n_{q}},x') \leq \operatorname{diam} (A_{n_{q}})<\frac{r}{2}$, because $n_{q} \geq M$.
- $d(x_{n_{q}},x_{0})<\frac{r}{2}$, because $q \geq L$ entails $x_{n_{q}} \in B_{r/2}\left(x_{0}\right)$.

Hence $d(x_{0},x')<r$ by the triangle inequality, which implies that $A_{n_{q}} \subset U_{\alpha_{0}}$. This yields the desired contradiction.
