= Lebesgue's lemma =

In mathematics, Lebesgue's lemma is an important statement in approximation theory. It provides a bound for the projection error, controlling the error of approximation by a linear subspace based on a linear projection relative to the optimal error together with the operator norm of the projection.

== Statement ==
Let (V, ||·||) be a normed vector space, U a subspace of V, and P a linear projector on U. Then for each v in V:

$$\|v-Pv\|\leq (1+\|P\|)\inf_{u\in U}\|v-u\|.$$

The proof is a one-line application of the triangle inequality: for any u in U, by writing v − Pv as (v − u) + (u − Pu) + P(u − v), it follows that

$$\|v-Pv\|\leq\|v-u\|+\|u-Pu\|+\|P(u-v)\|\leq(1+\|P\|)\|u-v\|$$

where the last inequality uses the fact that u = Pu together with the definition of the operator norm ||P||.

== See also ==
- Lebesgue constants
