= Rational approximation =

Rational approximation may refer to:

- Diophantine approximation, the approximation of real numbers by rational numbers
- Padé approximation, the approximation of functions obtained by set of Padé approximants
- Any approximation represented in a form of rational function

== See also ==
- Dirichlet's approximation theorem
- Simple rational approximation
