= Discrete Chebyshev transform =

In applied mathematics, a discrete Chebyshev transform (abbreviated DCT, DChT, or DTT) is an analog of the discrete Fourier transform for a function of a real interval, converting in either direction between function values at a set of Chebyshev nodes and coefficients of a function in Chebyshev polynomial basis. Like the Chebyshev polynomials, it is named after Pafnuty Chebyshev.

The two most common types of discrete Chebyshev transforms use the grid of Chebyshev zeros, the zeros of the Chebyshev polynomials of the first kind $T_n (x)$ and the grid of Chebyshev extrema, the extrema of the Chebyshev polynomials of the first kind, which are also the zeros of the Chebyshev polynomials of the second kind $U_n (x)$. Both of these transforms result in coefficients of Chebyshev polynomials of the first kind.

Other discrete Chebyshev transforms involve related grids and coefficients of Chebyshev polynomials of the second, third, or fourth kinds.

== Roots grid ==
The discrete Chebyshev transform of ${u(x)}$ at the points ${x_n}$ is given by:

$$a_m =\frac{p_m}{N}\sum_{n=0}^{N-1} u(x_n) T_m (x_n),$$

where

$$x_n = -\cos \frac{\bigl(n+\tfrac12\bigr)\pi}{N},$$

$$a_m = \frac{p_m}{N}  \sum_{n=0}^{N-1} u(x_n) \cos\left(m \cos^{-1}(x_n)\right),$$

with $p_m =1$ if and only if $m=0$ and $p_m = 2$ otherwise.

Using the definition of $x_n$,

$$\begin{align}
a_m &=\frac{p_m}{N} \sum_{n=0}^{N-1} u(x_n) \cos\frac{m\bigl(N+n+\tfrac12\bigr)\pi}{N} \\
&=\frac{p_m}{N} \sum_{n=0}^{N-1} u(x_n) (-1)^m\cos \frac{m\bigl(n+\tfrac12\bigr)\pi}{N}.
\end{align}$$

The inverse transform is

$$u_n =\sum_{m=0}^{N-1} a_m T_m (x_n)
= \sum_{m=0}^{N-1} a_m (-1)^m\cos\frac{m\bigl(n+\tfrac12\bigr)\pi}{N}.$$

(This is the standard Chebyshev series evaluated on the roots grid.)

This discrete Chebyshev transform can be computed by manipulating the input arguments to a discrete cosine transform, for example, using the following MATLAB code:

function a=fct(f, l)
% x =-cos(pi/N*((0:N-1)'+1/2));

f = f(end:-1:1,:);
A = size(f); N = A(1); 
if exist('A(3)', 'var') && A(3)~=1
    for i=1:A(3)
        a(:,:,i) = sqrt(2/N) * dct(f(:,:,i));
        a(1,:,i) = a(1,:,i) / sqrt(2);
    end
else
    a = sqrt(2/N) * dct(f(:,:,i));
    a(1,:)=a(1,:) / sqrt(2);
end

MATLAB's built-in dct (discrete cosine transform) function is implemented using the fast Fourier transform.

The inverse transform is given by the MATLAB code:

function f=ifct(a, l)
% x = -cos(pi/N*((0:N-1)'+1/2)) 
k = size(a); N=k(1);

a = idct(sqrt(N/2) * [a(1,:) * sqrt(2); a(2:end,:)]);

end

== Extrema grid ==
This transform uses the grid:

$$x_n=-\cos\frac{n\pi}{N}$$

$$T_n (x_m) = \cos\left(\frac{m n\pi}{N}+n\pi\right)=(-1)^n \cos\frac{m n \pi}{N}$$

This extrema grid is more widely used.

In this case the transform and its inverse are

$$u(x_n)=u_n =\sum_{m=0}^{N} a_m T_m (x_n),$$

$$a_m =\frac{p_m}{N}\biggl(\tfrac12 \bigl(u_0 (-1)^m +u_N\bigr)+\sum_{n=1}^{N-1} u_n T_m (x_n)\biggr),$$

where $p_m =1$ if and only if $m=0$ or $m = N$ and $p_m = 2$ otherwise.

== Usage and implementations ==
The primary uses of the discrete Chebyshev transform are numerical integration, interpolation, and stable numerical differentiation. An implementation which provides these features is given in the C++ library Boost.

== See also ==
- Chebyshev polynomials
- Discrete cosine transform
- Discrete Fourier transform
- List of Fourier-related transforms
