= Minimal polynomial of 2cos(2pi/n) =

Equation for the real part of a root of unity

In number theory, the real parts of the roots of unity are related to one-another by means of the minimal polynomial of $2\cos(2\pi/n).$ The roots of the minimal polynomial are twice the real part of the roots of unity, where the real part of a root of unity is just $\cos\left(2k\pi/n\right)$ with $k$ coprime with $n.$

== Formal definition ==
For an integer $n \geq 1$, the minimal polynomial $\Psi_n(x)$ of $2\cos(2\pi/n)$ is the non-zero integer-coefficient monic polynomial of smallest degree for which $\Psi_n\!\left(2\cos(2\pi/n)\right) = 0$.

For every n, the polynomial $\Psi_n(x)$ is monic, has integer coefficients, and is irreducible over the integers and the rational numbers. All its roots are real; they are the real numbers $2\cos\left(2k\pi/n\right)$ with $k$ coprime with $n$ and either $1 \le k \le n/2$ or $k=n=1.$ These roots are twice the real parts of the primitive nth roots of unity. The number of integers $k$ relatively prime to $n$ is given by Euler's totient function $\varphi(n);$ it follows that the degree of $\Psi_n(x)$ is $1$ for $n=1,2$ and $\varphi(n)/2$ for $n\geq 3.$

The first two polynomials are $\Psi_1(x) = x - 2$ and $\Psi_2(x) = x + 2.$

The polynomials $\Psi_n(x)$ are typical examples of irreducible polynomials whose roots are all real and which have a cyclic Galois group.

== Examples ==
The first few polynomials $\Psi_n(x)$ are

$$\begin{align}
\Psi_1(x) &= x - 2 \\
\Psi_2(x) &= x + 2 \\
\Psi_3(x) &= x + 1 \\
\Psi_4(x) &= x \\
\Psi_5(x) &= x^2 + x - 1 \\
\Psi_6(x) &= x - 1 \\
\Psi_7(x) &= x^3 + x^2 - 2x - 1 \\
\Psi_8(x) &= x^2 - 2 \\
\Psi_9(x) &= x^3 - 3x + 1 \\
\Psi_{10}(x) &= x^2 - x - 1 \\
\Psi_{11}(x) &= x^5 + x^4 - 4x^3 - 3x^2 +3x + 1 \\
\Psi_{12}(x) &= x^2 - 3\\
\Psi_{13}(x) &= x^6 + x^5 - 5 x^4 - 4 x^3 + 6 x^2 + 3 x - 1\\
\Psi_{14}(x) &= x^3 - x^2 - 2 x + 1 \\
\Psi_{15}(x) &= x^4 - x^3 - 4 x^2 + 4 x + 1 \\
\Psi_{16}(x) &= x^4 - 4 x^2 + 2 \\
\Psi_{17}(x) &= x^8 + x^7 - 7 x^6 - 6 x^5 + 15 x^4 + 10 x^3 - 10 x^2 - 4 x + 1 \\
\Psi_{18}(x) &= x^3 - 3 x - 1 \\
\Psi_{19}(x) &= x^9 + x^8 - 8 x^7 - 7 x^6 + 21 x^5 + 15 x^4 - 20 x^3 - 10 x^2 + 5 x + 1 \\
\Psi_{20}(x) &= x^4 - 5 x^2 + 5
\end{align}$$

== Explicit form if n is odd ==
If $n$ is an odd prime, the polynomial $\Psi_{n}(x)$ can be written in terms of binomial coefficients following a "zigzag path" through Pascal's triangle:

Putting $n=2m+1$ and

$$\begin{align}
\chi_{n}(x):&= \binom {m}{0}x^{m}+\binom {m-1}{0}x^{m-1}-\binom {m-1}{1}x^{m-2}-\binom {m-2}{1}x^{m-3}+\binom {m-2}{2}x^{m-4}+\binom {m-3}{2}x^{m-5}--++\cdots\\
&= \sum_{k=0}^m (-1)^{\lfloor k/2\rfloor}\binom {m-\lfloor (k+1)/2\rfloor}{\lfloor k/2\rfloor} x^{m-k}\\
&= \binom {m}{m}x^{m}+\binom {m-1}{m-1}x^{m-1}-\binom {m-1}{m-2}x^{m-2}-\binom {m-2}{m-3}x^{m-3}+\binom {m-2}{m-4}x^{m-4}+\binom {m-3}{m-5}x^{m-5}--++\cdots\\
&= \sum_{k=0}^m (-1)^{\lfloor (m-k)/2\rfloor}\binom {\lfloor (m+k)/2\rfloor}{k} x^{k},
\end{align}$$

then we have $\Psi_{p}(x)=\chi_{p}(x)$ for primes $p$.

If $n$ is odd but not a prime, the same polynomial $\chi_{n}(x)$, as can be expected, is reducible and, corresponding to the structure of the cyclotomic polynomials $\Phi_{d}(x)$ reflected by the formula $\prod_{d\mid n}\Phi_d(x) = x^n - 1$, turns out to be just the product of all $\Psi_{d}(x)$ for the divisors $d>1$ of $n$, including $n$ itself:

$$\prod _{d\mid n\atop d>1}\Psi_{d}( x)=\chi_{n}( x).$$

This means that the $\Psi_{d}(x)$ are exactly the irreducible factors of $\chi_{n}(x)$, which allows to easily obtain $\Psi_{d}(x)$ for any odd $d$, knowing its degree $\frac{1}{2}\varphi(d)$. For example,

$$\begin{align}
\chi_{15}( x)&=  x^7 + x^6 - 6x^5 - 5x^4 + 10x^3 + 6x^2 - 4x - 1\\
&=                       (x + 1)(x^2 + x - 1)(x^4 - x^3 - 4x^2 + 4x + 1)\\
&=\Psi_{3}(x)\cdot\Psi_{5}(x)\cdot\Psi_{15}(x).
\end{align}$$

== Explicit form if n is even ==
From the below formula in terms of Chebyshev polynomials and the product formula for odd $n$ above, we can derive for even $n$

$$\prod _{d\mid n\atop d>1}\Psi_{d}( x)= \Big(\chi_{n+1}(x)+\chi_{n-1}(x)\Big).$$

Independently of this, if $n=2^k$ is an even prime power, we have for $k\ge 2$ the recursion (see OEIS: A158982)

$$\Psi_{2^{k+1}}( x)=(\Psi_{2^k}( x))^2-2$$,

starting with $\Psi_{4}( x)=x$.

== Roots ==
The roots of $\Psi_n(x)$ are given by $2\cos\left(\frac{2\pi k}{n}\right)$, where $1 \leq k < \frac{n}{2}$ and $\gcd(k, n) = 1$. Since $\Psi_n(x)$ is monic, we have

$$\Psi_n(x) = \displaystyle\prod_{\begin{array}{c} 1 \leq k < \frac{n}{2}\\ \gcd(k, n) = 1 \end{array} } \left(x - 2\cos\left(\frac{2\pi k}{n}\right)\right).$$

Combining this result with the fact that the function $\cos(x)$ is even, we find that $2\cos\left(\frac{2\pi k}{n}\right)$ is an algebraic integer for any positive integer $n$ and any integer $k$.

== Relation to the cyclotomic polynomials ==
For a positive integer $n$, let $\zeta_n = \exp\left(\frac{2\pi i}{n}\right) = \cos\left(\frac{2\pi}{n}\right) + \sin\left(\frac{2\pi}{n}\right)i$, a primitive $n$-th root of unity. Then the minimal polynomial of $\zeta_n$ is given by the $n$-th cyclotomic polynomial $\Phi_n(x)$. Since $\zeta_n^{-1} = \cos\left(\frac{2\pi}{n}\right) - \sin\left(\frac{2\pi}{n}\right)i$, the relation between $2\cos\left(\frac{2\pi}{n}\right)$ and $\zeta_n$ is given by $2\cos\left(\frac{2\pi}{n}\right) = \zeta_n + \zeta_n^{-1}$. This relation can be exhibited in the following identity proved by Lehmer, which holds for any non-zero complex number $z$:

$$\Psi_n\left(z + z^{-1}\right) = z^{-\frac{\varphi(n)}{2}}\Phi_n(z)$$

== Relation to Chebyshev polynomials ==
In 1993, Watkins and Zeitlin established the following relation between $\Psi_n(x)$ and Chebyshev polynomials of the first kind.

If $n = 2s + 1$ is odd, then

$$\prod_{d \mid n}\Psi_d(2x) = 2(T_{s + 1}(x) - T_s(x)),$$

and if $n = 2s$ is even, then

$$\prod_{d \mid n}\Psi_d(2x) = 2(T_{s + 1}(x) - T_{s - 1}(x)).$$

If $n$ is a power of $2$, we have moreover directly

$$\Psi_{2^{k+1}}(2x) = 2T_{2^{k-1}}(x) .$$

== Absolute value of the constant coefficient ==
The absolute value of the constant coefficient of $\Psi_n(x)$ can be determined as follows:

$$|\Psi_n(0)| = \begin{cases}0 & \text{if}\ n = 4,\\2 & \text{if}\ n = 2^k, k \geq 0, k \neq 2,\\ p & \text{if}\ n = 4p^k, k \geq 1, p > 2\ \text{prime,}\\1 & \text{otherwise.}\end{cases}$$

== Generated algebraic number field ==
The algebraic number field $K_n = \mathbb{Q}\left(\zeta_n + \zeta_n^{-1}\right)$ is the maximal real subfield of a cyclotomic field $\mathbb Q(\zeta_n)$. If $\mathcal O_{K_n}$ denotes the ring of integers of $K_n$, then $\mathcal O_{K_n} = \mathbb Z\left[\zeta_n + \zeta_n^{-1}\right]$. In other words, the set $\left\{1, \zeta_n + \zeta_n^{-1}, \ldots, \left(\zeta_n + \zeta_n^{-1}\right)^{\frac{\varphi(n)}{2} - 1}\right\}$ is an integral basis of $\mathcal O_{K_n}$. In view of this, the discriminant of the algebraic number field $K_n$ is equal to the discriminant of the polynomial $\Psi_n(x)$, that is

$$D_{K_n} = \begin{cases}2^{(m - 1)2^{m - 2} - 1} & \text{if}\ n = 2^m, m > 2,\\p^{(mp^m - (m + 1)p^{m - 1} - 1)/2} & \text{if}\ n = p^m\ \text{or}\ 2p^m, p > 2\ \text{prime},\\ \left(\prod_{i = 1}^{\omega(n)}p_i^{e_i - 1/(p_i - 1)}\right)^{\frac{\varphi(n)}{2}} & \text{if}\ \omega(n) > 1, k \neq 2p^m.\end{cases}$$
