= Trigonometric polynomial =

Concept in mathematics

In the mathematical subfields of numerical analysis and mathematical analysis, a trigonometric polynomial is a finite linear combination of functions sin(nx) and cos(nx) with n taking on the values of one or more natural numbers. The coefficients may be taken as real numbers, for real-valued functions. For complex coefficients, there is no difference between such a function and a finite Fourier series.

Trigonometric polynomials are widely used, for example in trigonometric interpolation applied to the interpolation of periodic functions. They are used also in the discrete Fourier transform.

The term trigonometric polynomial for the real-valued case can be seen as using the analogy: the functions sin(nx) and cos(nx) are similar to the monomial basis for polynomials. In the complex case the trigonometric polynomials are spanned by the positive and negative powers of $e^{ix}$, i.e., Laurent polynomials in $z$ under the change of variables $x \mapsto z := e^{ix}$.

== Definition ==
Any function T of the form

$$T(x) =  a_0 + \sum_{n=1}^N a_n \cos nx + \sum_{n=1}^N b_n \sin nx \qquad (x \in \mathbb{R})$$

with complex-valued coefficients $a_n$ and $b_n$ and at least one of the highest-degree coefficients $a_N$ and $b_N$ non-zero, is called a complex trigonometric polynomial of degree N. The cosine and sine are the even and odd parts of the exponential of an imaginary variable,
$$\cos nx = \tfrac12\bigl(e^{inx} + e^{-inx}\bigr), \quad \sin nx = -\tfrac12i\bigl(e^{inx} - e^{-inx}\bigr),$$
so the trigonometric polynomial can alternately be written as
$$T(x) = \sum_{n=-N}^N c_n e^{inx} \qquad (x \in \mathbb{R}),$$
with complex coefficients $c_0 = a_0$ and
$$\quad c_k = \tfrac12(a_k - b_ki), \quad c_{-k} = \tfrac12(a_k + b_ki),$$
for all $k$ from 1 to $N$.

If the coefficients $a_n$ and $b_n$ are real for all $n$, then $T$ is called a real trigonometric polynomial. When using the exponential form, the complex coefficients satisfy $c_{-n} = \overline{c}_{n}$ for all $n\in[-N,N]$.

== Properties ==
A trigonometric polynomial can be considered a periodic function on the real line, with period some divisor of $2\pi$, or as a function on the unit circle.

Trigonometric polynomials are dense in the space of continuous functions on the unit circle, with the uniform norm; this is a special case of the Stone–Weierstrass theorem. More concretely, for every continuous function $f$ and every $\epsilon > 0$ there exists a trigonometric polynomial $T$ such that $|f(z) - T(z)| < \epsilon$ for all $z$. Fejér's theorem states that the arithmetic means of the partial sums of the Fourier series of $f$ converge uniformly to $f$ provided $f$ is continuous on the circle; these partial sums can be used to approximate $f$.

A trigonometric polynomial of degree $N$ has a maximum of $2N$ roots in a real interval $[a, a+2\pi)$ unless it is the zero function.

== Fejér-Riesz theorem ==
The Fejér-Riesz theorem states that every positive real trigonometric polynomial
$$t(x) = \sum_{n=-N}^{N} c_n e^{i n x},$$
satisfying $t(x)>0$ for all $x\in\mathbb{R}$, can be represented as the square of the modulus of another (usually complex) trigonometric polynomial $q(x)$ such that:
$$t(x) = |q(x)|^2 = q(x)\overline{q(x)}.$$
Or, equivalently, every Laurent polynomial
$$w(z)=\sum_{n=-N}^{N} w_{n}z^{n},$$
with $w_n \in\mathbb{C}$ that satisfies $w(\zeta)\geq 0$ for all $\zeta \in \mathbb{T}$ can be written as:
$$w(\zeta)=|p(\zeta)|^2=p(\zeta)\overline{p(\zeta)},$$
for some polynomial
$$p(z) = p_{0} + p_{1}z + \cdots + p_{N}z^{N},$$
and $p(z)$ can be chosen to have no zeroes in the open unit disk $\mathbb{D}$. The Fejér-Riesz theorem arises naturally in spectral theory and the polynomial factorization $w(\zeta)= p(\zeta)\overline{p(\zeta)}$ is also called the spectral factorization (or Wiener-Hopf factorization) of $w(\zeta)$.

== See also ==
- Trigonometric series
- Quasi-polynomial
- Exponential polynomial
