= Chebfun =

Numerical computation software system

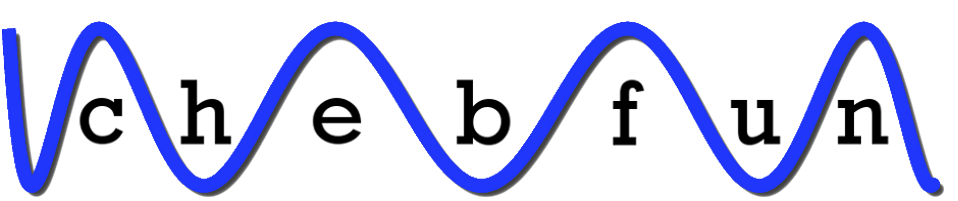
- Developers: The Chebfun Team, University of Oxford
- Stable release: v5.7.0 / 02 June 2017
- Written in: MATLAB
- Type: Numerical software
- License: BSD
- Website: www.chebfun.org
- Repository: github.com/chebfun/chebfun

Chebfun is a free/open-source software system written in MATLAB for numerical computation with functions of a real variable. It is based on the idea of overloading MATLAB's commands for vectors and matrices to analogous commands for functions and operators. Thus, for example, whereas the SUM command in MATLAB adds up the elements of a vector, the SUM command in Chebfun evaluates a definite integral. Similarly the backslash command in MATLAB becomes a Chebfun command for solving differential equations.

The mathematical basis of Chebfun is numerical algorithms involving piecewise polynomial interpolants and Chebyshev polynomials, and this is where the name "Cheb" comes from. The package aims to combine the feel of symbolic computing systems like Maple and Mathematica with the speed of floating-point numerics.

The Chebfun project is based in the Mathematical Institute at the University of Oxford and was initiated in 2002 by Lloyd N. Trefethen and his student Zachary Battles. The most recent version, Version 5.7.0, was released on June 2, 2017.

Chebfun2, a software system that extends Chebfun to two dimensions, was made publicly available on 4 March 2013. Following Chebfun2, Spherefun (extension to the unit sphere) and Chebfun3 (extension to three dimensions) were made publicly available in May and July 2016.

== Features ==
- Approximation of functions in 1D, including functions with jumps
- Approximation of smooth bivariate functions (Chebfun2)
- Approximation of smooth trivariate functions (Chebfun3)
- Approximation of smooth functions on the unit sphere (Spherefun)
- Quadrature
- Rootfinding
- 1D global optimisation
- Bivariate and trivariate rootfinding
- Ordinary differential equations
- Partial differential equations
- Vector calculus

== Example usage ==
A user may begin by initialising the variable x, on the interval [0,10], say.

>> x = chebfun('x',[0,10]);

This variable can now be used to perform further computations, for example, computing and plotting roots of a function:

>> f = sin(x) + sin(x.^2);  plot(f)
>> r = roots(f); hold on, plot(r,f(r),'.r'), hold off

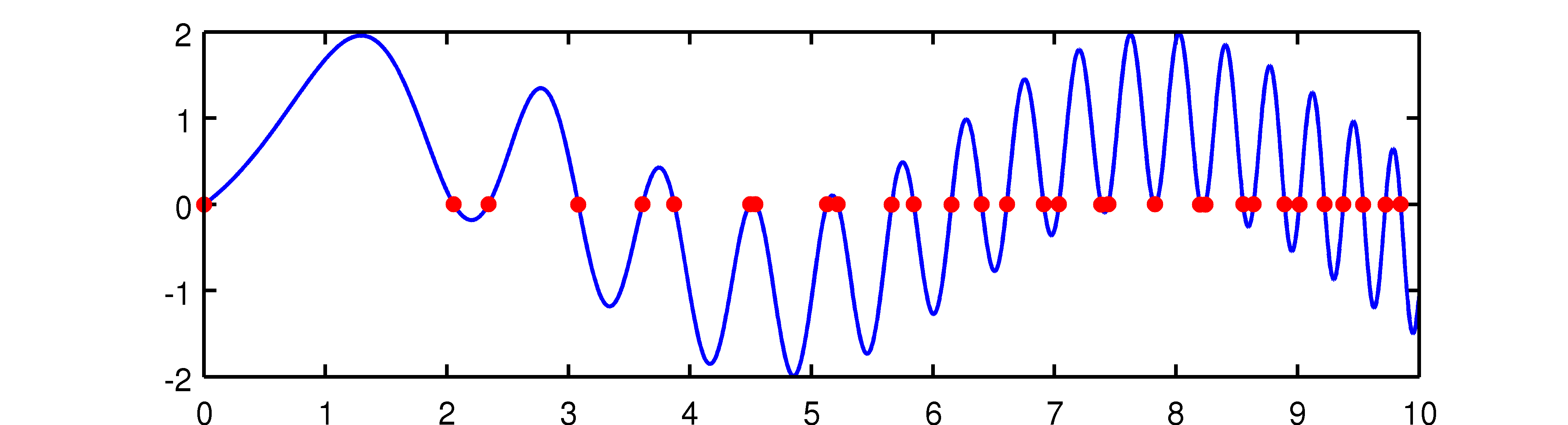

The definite integral can be computed with:

>> sum(f) 
ans 
   = 2.422742429006079
