= Dyson Brownian motion =

Stochastic process

In mathematics, the Dyson Brownian motion is a real-valued continuous-time stochastic process named for Freeman Dyson. Dyson studied this process in the context of random matrix theory.

There are several equivalent definitions:

Definition by stochastic differential equation:
$$d \lambda_i=d B_i+\sum_{1 \leq j \leq n: j \neq i} \frac{d t}{\lambda_i-\lambda_j}$$
where $B_1, ..., B_n$ are different and independent Wiener processes. Start with a Hermitian matrix with eigenvalues $\lambda_1(0), \lambda_2(0), ..., \lambda_n(0)$, then let it perform Brownian motion in the space of Hermitian matrices. Its eigenvalues constitute a Dyson Brownian motion. This is defined within the Weyl chamber $W_n := \{(x_1, \dots, x_n) \in \R^n: x_1 < \dots < x_n\}$, as well as any coordinate-permutation of it.

Start with $n$ independent Wiener processes started at different locations $\lambda_1(0), \lambda_2(0), ..., \lambda_n(0)$, then condition on those processes to be non-intersecting for all time. The resulting process is a Dyson Brownian motion starting at the same $\lambda_1(0), \lambda_2(0), ..., \lambda_n(0)$.

== Random matrix theory ==
In Random Matrix Theory, the Gaussian unitary ensemble is a fundamental ensemble. It is defined as a probability distribution over the space of $A \in \R^{n \times n}$ Hermitian matrices, with probability density function $\rho(A) \propto e^{- \frac 12 tr(A^2)}$.

Consider a Hermitian matrix $A \in \R^{n \times n}$. The space of Hermitian matrices can be mapped to the space of real vectors $\R^{n^2}$:
$$A \mapsto (A_{11}, \dots, A_{nn}, \sqrt{2} Re(A_{12}), \dots, \sqrt{2} Re(A_{n-1, n}), \sqrt{2} Im(A_{12}), \dots, \sqrt{2} Im(A_{n-1, n}))$$
This is an isometry, where the matrix norm is Frobenius norm. By reversing this process, a standard Brownian motion in $\R^{n^2}$ maps back to a Brownian motion in the space of $n\times n$ Hermitian matrices:
$$dA = \begin{bmatrix}
dB_{11} & \frac{1}{\sqrt{2}} (dB_{12} + idB_{12}') & \frac{1}{\sqrt{2}} (dB_{13} + idB_{13}') & \cdots & \frac{1}{\sqrt{2}} (dB_{1n} + idB_{1n}') \\
\frac{1}{\sqrt{2}} (dB_{12} - idB_{12}') & dB_{22} & \frac{1}{\sqrt{2}} (dB_{23} + idB_{23}') & \cdots & \frac{1}{\sqrt{2}} (dB_{2n} + idB_{2n}') \\
\frac{1}{\sqrt{2}} (dB_{13} - idB_{13}') & \frac{1}{\sqrt{2}} (dB_{23} - idB_{23}') & dB_{33} & \cdots & \frac{1}{\sqrt{2}} (dB_{3n} + idB_{3n}') \\
\vdots & \vdots & \vdots & \ddots & \vdots \\
\frac{1}{\sqrt{2}} (dB_{1n} - idB_{1n}') & \frac{1}{\sqrt{2}} (dB_{2n} - idB_{2n}') & \frac{1}{\sqrt{2}} (dB_{3n} - idB_{3n}') & \cdots & dB_{nn}
\end{bmatrix}$$
The claim is that the eigenvalues of $A$ evolve according to
$$d \lambda_i=d B_i+\sum_{1 \leq j \leq n: j \neq i} \frac{d t}{\lambda_i-\lambda_j}$$

Proof
Proof

Since each $dB$ is on the order of $O(\sqrt{dt})$, we can equivalently write $dA = \sqrt{dt}G$, where $G$ is a random Hermitian matrix where each entry is on the order of $O(1)$. By construction of the standard Brownian motion, $dA$ is independent of $A$, so $G$ is independent of $A$, and can be written as
$$dA = \begin{bmatrix}
X_{11} & \frac{1}{\sqrt{2}} (X_{12} + iY_{12}) & \frac{1}{\sqrt{2}} (X_{13} + iY_{13}) & \cdots & \frac{1}{\sqrt{2}} (X_{1n} + iY_{1n}) \\
\frac{1}{\sqrt{2}} (X_{12} - iY_{12}) & X_{22} & \frac{1}{\sqrt{2}} (X_{23} + iY_{23}) & \cdots & \frac{1}{\sqrt{2}} (X_{2n} + iY_{2n}) \\
\frac{1}{\sqrt{2}} (X_{13} - iY_{13}) & \frac{1}{\sqrt{2}} (X_{23} - iY_{23}) & X_{33} & \cdots & \frac{1}{\sqrt{2}} (X_{3n} + iY_{3n}) \\
\vdots & \vdots & \vdots & \ddots & \vdots \\
\frac{1}{\sqrt{2}} (X_{1n} - iY_{1n}) & \frac{1}{\sqrt{2}} (X_{2n} - iY_{2n}) & \frac{1}{\sqrt{2}} (X_{3n} - iY_{3n}) & \cdots & X_{nn}
\end{bmatrix}$$
where each random variable $X_{ij}, Y_{ij}$ is standard normal. In other words, $G$ is distributed according to the GUE(n).

By the first and second Hadamard variation formulas and Ito’s lemma, we have
$$\lambda_i(t+dt) = \lambda_i(t) + \sqrt{dt} u_i^* G u_i + dt \sum_{j\neq i} \frac{\mathbb E[|u_i^* G u_j|^2]}{\lambda_i - \lambda_j}$$

Since $G$ is sampled from GUE(n), it is rotationally symmetric. Also, by assumption, the eigenvector $u_i$ has norm 1, so $\sqrt{dt} u_i^* G u_i$ has the same distribution as $\sqrt{dt} e_1^*G e_1$, which is distributed as $dB$.

Similarly, $\mathbb E[|u_i^* G u_j|^2] =1$.

=== Infinitesimal generator ===
Define the adjoint Dyson operator:
$$D^* F:=\frac{1}{2} \sum_{i=1}^n \partial_{\lambda_i}^2 F+\sum_{1 \leq i, j \leq n: i \neq j} \frac{\partial_{\lambda_i} F}{\lambda_i-\lambda_j} .$$
For any smooth function $F: \R^n \to \R$ with bounded derivatives, by direct differentiation, we have the Kolmogorov backward equation $\partial_t \mathbb E[F] = \mathbb E[D^* F]$. Therefore, the Kolmogorov forward equation for the eigenspectrum is $\partial\rho = D\rho$, where $D$ is the Dyson operator by
$$D \rho:=\frac{1}{2} \sum_{i=1}^n \partial_{\lambda_i}^2 \rho-\sum_{1 \leq i, j \leq n: i \neq j} \partial_{\lambda_i}\left(\frac{\rho}{\lambda_i-\lambda_j}\right)$$
Let $\rho(t, \lambda) = \Delta_n(\lambda) u(t, \lambda)$, where $\Delta_n := \prod_{i < j}(\lambda_i - \lambda_j)$ is the Vandermonde determinant, then the time-evolution of eigenspectrum is equivalent to the time-evolution of $u$, which happens to satisfy the heat equation $\partial_t u = \frac 12 \sum_i \partial^2_i u$,

This can be proven by starting with the identity $\partial_{\lambda_i} \Delta_n= \Delta_n \sum_{1 \leq j \leq n: i \neq j} \frac{1}{\lambda_i-\lambda_j}$, then apply the fact that the Vandermonde determinant is harmonic: $\sum_i \partial_i^2 \Delta_n = 0$.

=== Johansson formula ===
Each Hermitian matrix with exactly two eigenvalues equal is stabilized by $U(2) \times U(1)^{n-2}$, so its orbit under the action of $U(n)$ has $\mathrm{dim}(U(n)) - \mathrm{dim}(U(2) \times U(1)^{n-2}) = n^2 - n - 2$ dimensions. Since the space of $n-1$ different eigenvalues is $(n-1)$-dimensional, the space of Hermitian matrix with exactly two eigenvalues equal has $n^2-3$ dimensions.

By a dimension-counting argument, $\rho$ vanishes at sufficiently high order on the border of the Weyl chamber, such that $u$ can be extended to all of $\R^n$ by antisymmetry, and this extension still satisfies the heat equation.

Now, suppose the random matrix walk begins at some deterministic $A(0)$. Let its eigenspectrum be $\nu = \lambda(A(0))$, then we have $u(0, \lambda) = \frac{1}{\Delta_n(\nu)} \sum_{\sigma \in S_n} (-1)^{|\sigma|} \delta(\lambda - \sigma(\nu))$, so by the solution to the heat equation, and the Leibniz formula for determinants, we have

Johansson formula—Let $A_0$ be a Hermitian matrix with simple spectrum $\nu=\left(\nu_1, \ldots, \nu_n\right)$, let $t>0$, and let $A_t = A_0 + t^{1 / 2} G$ where $G$ is drawn from GUE. Then the spectrum $\lambda=\left(\lambda_1, \ldots, \lambda_n\right)$ of $A_t$ has probability density function

$$\rho(t, \lambda)=\frac{1}{(2 \pi t)^{n / 2}} \frac{\Delta_n(\lambda)}{\Delta_n(\nu)} \operatorname{det}\left(e^{-\left(\lambda_i-\nu_j\right)^2 / 2 t}\right)_{1 \leq i, j \leq n}$$

on the Weyl chamber.

== Harish-Chandra-Itzykson-Zuber integral formula ==
Dyson Brownian motion allows a short proof of the Harish-Chandra-Itzykson-Zuber integral formula.

Harish-Chandra-Itzykson-Zuber integral formula—If $A, B$ have no repeated eigenvalues, and $t$ is a nonzero complex number, then -
$$\int_{U(n)} \exp \left(t \operatorname{tr}\left(A U B U^*\right)\right) d U = c_n\frac{\det\left[\exp \left(t \lambda_i(A) \lambda_j(B)\right)\right]_{1 \leq i, j \leq n}}{t^{\left(n^2-n\right) / 2} \Delta_n(\lambda(A)) \Delta_n(\lambda(B))}$$

where $U$ is integrated over the Haar probability measure of the unitary group $U(n)$, and $c_n = \prod_{i=1}^{n} i!$.

Proof
Proof

Let the GUE(n) probability distribution over $V_n$ be defined as $\rho(M)dM$, where $dM = dM_{11}\dots dM_{nn}d(Re(M_{12})) \dots d(Im(M_{n, n-1}))$, and $\rho(M) = C_n e^{-\frac 12 tr(M^2)}$ and $C_n$ is a constant. Similarly, the eigenvalue distribution for the GUE(n) is
$$\rho(\lambda) = \frac{1}{(2 \pi)^{n / 2} c_n} \Delta_n(\lambda)^2 e^{-\|\lambda\|_2^2 / 2} d \lambda$$
where $d\lambda = d\lambda_1 \dots d\lambda_n$, and $c_n$ is another constant., and $\Delta_n = \prod_{1 \leq i<j \leq n}\left(\lambda_i-\lambda_j\right)$ is the Vandermonde determinant.

If $f: V_n \to \C$ is unitarily invariant, with sufficient regularity and decay, then it can be decomposed as $f(M_n) = f(\lambda(M_n))$. By Riesz representation theorem, there exists some function $w$ such that $\int f(M) dM = \int f(\lambda) w(\lambda) d\lambda$, which by the above argument equals
$$w(\lambda) = \rho(\lambda) / \rho(M) =  \frac{\Delta_n(\lambda)^2}{c_nC_n (2\pi)^{n/2}}$$

Given two such unitarily invariant functions $f, g$ with sufficient regularity and decay, then consider their heat kernel convolution
$$X = \iint dAdB \; f(A) \frac{C_n}{t^{n^2/2}}e^{-\frac{tr(A-B)^2}{2t}}g(B)$$

We compute $X$ in one way.

Let $f_t(A) := f(A) e^{-\frac{tr(A^2)}{2t}}, g_t(B) := g(B) e^{-\frac{tr(B^2)}{2t}}$, then the quantity is
$$\begin{aligned}
X&=  \frac{C_n}{t^{n^2/2}} \int_{V_n}\int_{V_n} f_t(A) e^{-\frac{tr(AB)}{t}} g_t(B) dAdB \\
&=  \frac{C_n}{t^{n^2/2}} \int_{V_n}\int_{V_n}\int_{U(n)} f_t(A) e^{\frac{tr(AUBU^*)}{t}} g_t(B) dAdBdU \\
&=  \frac{C_n}{t^{n^2/2}} \int_{V_n}\int_{V_n} f_t(A) K_t(A,B) g_t(B) dAdB\\
\end{aligned}$$
where we integrate over the Haar measure of the unitary group $U(n)$, and use the fact that $g_t(B)$ is unitarily invariant, and we define the kernel
$$K_t(A,B) := \int_{U(n)}e^{\frac{tr(AUBU^*)}{t}} dU$$

Since $K_t, f_t, g_t$ are all unitarily invariant, we have
$$X = \frac{1}{C_n(2 \pi)^n c_n^2 t^{n^2 / 2}} \int_{W_n} \int_{W_n} f_t(\lambda) g_t(\nu) K_t(\lambda, \nu) \Delta_n(\lambda)^2 \Delta_n(\nu)^2 d \lambda d \nu$$

We compute $X$ in another way.

Fix $B$, then set $G = (A-B)/\sqrt t$, then we have
$$X = \int_{V_n}\int_{V_n} f(B+\sqrt{t}G)C_n e^{-\frac 12 tr(G^2)}  dGdB$$

Apply the Johansson formula, and convert the domain of integral to the Weyl chamber:
$$X = \frac{1}{C_nc_n(2\pi)^{n}t^{n/2}}\iint f(\lambda) g(\nu) \Delta_n(\lambda) \Delta_n(\nu) \det\left[e^{-\frac{(\lambda_i - \nu_j)^2}{2t}}\right]_{i,j} d\lambda d\nu$$

Equate the two results, and simplify, we obtain the equality.

== Ginibre formula ==
Ginibre formula (Tao 2012, page 251)—
$$\rho(\lambda)=\frac{1}{(2 \pi)^{n / 2} 1!\ldots n!} e^{-|\lambda|^2 / 2}\left|\Delta_n(\lambda)\right|^2$$
on the Weyl chamber.

Proof
Proof

The GUE is constructed as the $t=1$ distribution when starting with $A_0$. So we take $t=1$ and $\nu \to 0$ in the Johansson formula.

$$\rho(\lambda)= \frac{\Delta_n(\lambda)}{(2 \pi)^{n / 2}}  \lim_{\nu \to 0}\frac{1}{\Delta_n(\nu)} \operatorname{det}\left(e^{-\frac 12 \left(\lambda_i-\nu_j\right)^2}\right)_{1 \leq i, j \leq n}$$

Since $e^{-\left(\lambda_i-\nu_j\right)^2 / 2} = e^{-\lambda_i^2/2}e^{-\nu_j^2/2}e^{\lambda_i \nu_j}$, we have
$$\operatorname{det}\left(e^{-\left(\lambda_i-\nu_j\right)^2 / 2}\right)_{1 \leq i, j \leq n}=e^{-|\lambda|^2 / 2} e^{-|\nu|^2 / 2} \operatorname{det}\left(e^{\lambda_i \nu_j}\right)_{1 \leq i, j \leq n}$$

Now by a property of Vandermonde matrix, at the $\nu \to 0$ limit,

$$\operatorname{det}\left(e^{\lambda_i \nu_j}\right)_{1 \leq i, j \leq n}=\frac{1}{1!\ldots n!} \Delta_n(\lambda) \Delta_n(\nu)+o\left(\Delta_n(\nu)\right)$$
uniformly in $\nu$.
