= Wronski =

Wronski or Wroński (feminine: Wrońska, plural: Wrońscy) is a Polish surname. Czech, Ukrainian and Russian variants include Vronski and Vronsky (feminine: Vronska, Vronskaya). It may refer to:

== People ==
- Christopher R. Wronski (1939–2017), electrical engineer who co-discovered the Staebler–Wronski effect
- Józef Maria Hoene-Wroński (1776–1853), Polish philosopher and mathematician (see Wronskian)
- Peter Vronsky, Canadian filmmaker and writer
- Petr Vronský (born 1946), Czech conductor
- Sergei Arkadevich Vronsky (1923–2003), Soviet and Russian cinematographer
- Eugenia Vronskaya (born 1966), Russian painter

== Fictional characters ==
- Alexei Vronsky, a character of Leo Tolstoy's novel Anna Karenina
- Michael "Mike" Vronsky, one of the main characters in Michael Cimino's The Deer Hunter

== See also ==
- Ronsky
- Vronsky & Babin
