= Ronsky =

Ronsky is a surname. Notable people with the surname include:

- Avichai Ronsky (1951–2018), Israeli military rabbi
- Janet Ronsky, Canadian biomechanical engineer

== See also ==
- Michael Nicolai Vladimirovich Ronsky, fictional Russian general in A Royal Scandal (1945 film)
- Wronski, a Polish surname with Czech, Ukrainian and Russian variants
