= Dickson invariant =

In mathematics, the Dickson invariant, named after Leonard Eugene Dickson, may mean:

- The Dickson invariant of an element of the orthogonal group in characteristic 2
- A modular invariant of a group studied by Dickson
