= Alexandre-Théophile Vandermonde =

French mathematician, musician and chemist

Alexandre-Théophile Vandermonde (28 February 1735 – 1 January 1796) was a French mathematician, musician, and chemist who worked with Bézout and Lavoisier; his name is now principally associated with determinant theory in mathematics. He was born in Paris, and died there.

== Biography ==
Vandermonde was a violinist, and became engaged with mathematics only around 1770. In Mémoire sur la résolution des équations (1771) he reported on symmetric functions and solution of cyclotomic polynomials; this paper anticipated later Galois theory (see also abstract algebra for the role of Vandermonde in the genesis of group theory). In Remarques sur des problèmes de situation (1771) he studied knight's tours, and presaged the development of knot theory by explicitly noting the importance of topological features when discussing the properties of knots:

"Whatever the twists and turns of a system of threads in space, one can always obtain an expression for the calculation of its dimensions, but this expression will be of little use in practice. The craftsman who fashions a braid, a net, or some knots will be concerned, not with questions of measurement, but with those of position: what he sees there is the manner in which the threads are interlaced"

The same year he was elected to the French Academy of Sciences. Mémoire sur des irrationnelles de différents ordres avec une application au cercle (1772) was on combinatorics, and Mémoire sur l'élimination (1772) on the foundations of determinant theory. These papers were presented to the Académie des Sciences, and constitute all his published mathematical work. The Vandermonde determinant does not make an explicit appearance.

He was professor at the École Normale Supérieure, member of the Conservatoire national des arts et métiers and examiner at the École polytechnique.

== Honors ==
- A special class of matrices, the Vandermonde matrices are named after him, as is an elementary fact of combinatorics, Vandermonde's identity.
- Vandermonde is the secret society of the Conservatoire National des Arts et Métiers.

== See also ==
- Knight's Tour
- Knot theory
- Vandermonde's identity
- Vandermonde polynomial
- Vandermonde matrix
