= Modular invariant =

In mathematics, a modular invariant may be

- A modular invariant of a group acting on a vector space of positive characteristic
- The elliptic modular function, giving the modular invariant of an elliptic curve.
