= Leonard Eugene Dickson =

American mathematician

- Born: January 22, 1874; Independence, Iowa, US
- Died: January 17, 1954 (aged 79); Harlingen, Texas, US
- Education: University of Chicago (Ph.D., 1896)
- Known for: Cayley–Dickson construction Dickson's conjecture Dickson's lemma Dickson invariant Dickson polynomial Modular invariant theory
- Awards: Newcomb Cleveland Prize (1923); Cole Prize in Algebra (1928)
- Scientific career
- Fields: Mathematics
- Workplaces: University of Chicago
- Thesis: The Analytic Representation of Substitutions on a Power of a Prime Number of Letters with a Discussion of the Linear Group (1896)
- Doctoral advisor: E. H. Moore
- Doctoral students: Abraham Adrian Albert; Frances Baker; Olive Hazlett; Mabel Gweneth Humphreys; Ralph James; Burton W. Jones; Claiborne Latimer; Marie Litzinger; Mayme Logsdon; Cyrus MacDuffee; Margaret Evelyn Mauch; Ivan M. Niven; Alexander Oppenheim; Gordon Pall; Mina Rees; Arnold Ross; Mildred Sanderson (Dickson’s first female doctoral student); Marion Elizabeth Stark; John Williamson

Leonard Eugene Dickson (January 22, 1874 – January 17, 1954) was an American mathematician. He was one of the first American researchers in abstract algebra, in particular the theory of finite fields and classical groups, and is also remembered for a three-volume history of number theory, History of the Theory of Numbers. The L. E. Dickson instructorships at the University of Chicago Department of Mathematics are named after him.

== Life ==
Dickson considered himself a Texan by virtue of having grown up in Cleburne, where his father was a banker, merchant, and real estate investor. He attended the University of Texas at Austin, where George Bruce Halsted encouraged his study of mathematics. Dickson earned a B.S. in 1893 and an M.S. in 1894, under Halsted's supervision. Dickson first specialised in Halsted's own specialty, geometry.

Both the University of Chicago and Harvard University welcomed Dickson as a Ph.D. student, and Dickson initially accepted Harvard's offer, but chose to attend Chicago instead. In 1896, when he was only 22 years of age, he was awarded Chicago's first doctorate in mathematics, for a dissertation titled The Analytic Representation of Substitutions on a Power of a Prime Number of Letters with a Discussion of the Linear Group, supervised by E. H. Moore.

Dickson then went to Leipzig and Paris to study under Sophus Lie and Camille Jordan, respectively. On returning to the US, he became an instructor at the University of California. In 1899 and at the extraordinarily young age of 25, Dickson was appointed associate professor at the University of Texas. Chicago countered by offering him a position in 1900, and he spent the balance of his career there. At Chicago, he supervised 53 Ph.D. theses; his most accomplished student was probably A. A. Albert. He was a visiting professor at the University of California in 1914, 1918, and 1922. In 1939, he returned to Texas to retire.

Dickson married Susan McLeod Davis in 1902; they had two children, Campbell and Eleanor.

Dickson was elected to the National Academy of Sciences in 1913, and was also a member of the American Philosophical Society, the American Academy of Arts and Sciences, the London Mathematical Society, the French Academy of Sciences and the Union of Czech Mathematicians and Physicists. Dickson was the first recipient of a prize created in 1924 by The American Association for the Advancement of Science, for his work on the arithmetics of algebras. Harvard (1936) and Princeton (1941) awarded him honorary doctorates.

Dickson presided over the American Mathematical Society in 1917–1918. His December 1918 presidential address, titled "Mathematics in War Perspective", criticized American mathematics for falling short of those of Britain, France, and Germany:

"Let it not again become possible that thousands of young men shall be so seriously handicapped in their Army and Navy work by lack of adequate preparation in mathematics."

In 1928, he was also the first recipient of the Cole Prize for algebra, awarded annually by the AMS, for his book Algebren und ihre Zahlentheorie.

It appears that Dickson was a hard man:

"A hard-bitten character, Dickson tended to speak his mind bluntly; he was always sparing in his praise for the work of others. ... he indulged his serious passions for bridge and billiards and reportedly did not like to lose at either game."

"He delivered terse and unpolished lectures and spoke sternly to his students. ... Given Dickson's intolerance for student weaknesses in mathematics, however, his comments could be harsh, even though not intended to be personal. He did not aim to make students feel good about themselves."

"Dickson had a sudden death trial for his prospective doctoral students: he assigned a preliminary problem which was shorter than a dissertation problem, and if the student could solve it in three months, Dickson would agree to oversee the graduate student's work. If not the student had to look elsewhere for an advisor."

== Work ==
Dickson had a major impact on American mathematics, especially abstract algebra. His mathematical output consists of 18 books and more than 250 papers. The Collected Mathematical Papers of Leonard Eugene Dickson fill six large volumes.

== The algebraist ==
In 1901, Dickson published his first book Linear groups with an exposition of the Galois field theory, a revision and expansion of his Ph.D. thesis. Teubner in Leipzig published the book, as there was no well-established American scientific publisher at the time. Dickson had already published 43 research papers in the preceding five years; all but seven on finite linear groups. Parshall (1991) described the book as follows:

"Dickson presented a unified, complete, and general theory of the classical linear groups—not merely over the prime field GF(p) as Jordan had done—but over the general finite field GF(p^{n}), and he did this against the backdrop of a well-developed theory of these underlying fields. ... his book represented the first systematic treatment of finite fields in the mathematical literature."

An appendix in this book lists the non-abelian simple groups then known having order less than 1 billion. He listed 53 of the 56 having order less than 1 million. The remaining three were found in 1960, 1965, and 1967.

Dickson worked on finite fields and extended the theory of linear associative algebras initiated by Joseph Wedderburn and Élie Cartan.

He started the study of modular invariants of a group.

In 1905, Wedderburn, then at Chicago on a Carnegie Fellowship, published a paper that included three claimed proofs of a theorem stating that all finite division algebras were commutative, now known as Wedderburn's theorem. The proofs all made clever use of the interplay between the additive group of a finite division algebra A, and the multiplicative group A* = A − {0}. Karen Parshall noted that the first of these three proofs had a gap not noticed at the time. Dickson also found a proof of this result but, believing Wedderburn's first proof to be correct, Dickson acknowledged Wedderburn's priority. But Dickson also noted that Wedderburn constructed his second and third proofs only after having seen Dickson's proof. She concluded that Dickson should be credited with the first correct proof.

Dickson's search for a counterexample to Wedderburn's theorem led him to investigate nonassociative algebras, and in a series of papers he found all possible three and four-dimensional (nonassociative) division algebras over a field.

In 1919 Dickson constructed Cayley numbers by a doubling process starting with quaternions $\mathbb{H}$. His method was extended to a doubling of $\mathbb{R}$ to produce $\mathbb{C}$, and of $\mathbb{C}$ to produce $\mathbb{H}$ by A. A. Albert in 1922, and the procedure is known now as the Cayley–Dickson construction of composition algebras.

== The number theorist ==
Dickson proved many interesting results in number theory, using results of Vinogradov to deduce the ideal Waring theorem in his investigations of additive number theory. He proved the Waring's problem for $k\ge 7$ under the further condition of

$$(3^k + 1)/(2^k - 1)\le [1.5^k] + 1$$

independently of Subbayya Sivasankaranarayana Pillai who proved it for $k\ge 6$ ahead of him.

The three-volume History of the Theory of Numbers (1919–23) is still much consulted today, covering divisibility and primality, Diophantine analysis, and quadratic and higher forms. The work contains little interpretation and makes no attempt to contextualize the results being described, yet it contains essentially every significant number theoretic idea from the dawn of mathematics up to the 1920s except for quadratic reciprocity and higher reciprocity laws. A planned fourth volume on these topics was never written. A. A. Albert remarked that this three volume work "would be a life's work by itself for a more ordinary man."

== Bibliography ==
- — (2003) [1901]. Magnus, Wilhelm (ed.). Linear groups: With an exposition of the Galois field theory. Dover Phoenix editions. New York: Dover Publications. ISBN 978-0-486-49548-4. MR 0104735. (online hathitrust. B.G. Teubner's Sammlung von lehrbüchern auf dem gebiete der mathematischen wissenschaften mit einschluss ihrer anwendungen. Bd. VI. B. G. Teubner. 1901.)
- — (1903) [1903]. Introduction to the theory of algebraic equations. New York: John Wiley & Sons. (online hathitrust. J. Wiley & Sons. 1903.)
- — (2010) [1914]. Linear algebras. Reprinting of Cambridge Tracts in Mathematics and Mathematical Physics, No. 16. Naub press. ISBN 978-1-178-36805-5. MR 0118745.
- — (2010) [1914]. Algebraic invariants. Cornell University Library. ISBN 978-1-4297-0042-9.
- — (2004) [1914]. On invariants and the theory of numbers. Dover Phoenix editions. New York: Dover Publications. ISBN 978-0-486-43828-3. MR 0201389.
- — (2009) [1914]. Elementary theory of equations. Cornell University Library. ISBN 978-1-112-27988-1.
- — (2005) [1919]. History of the theory of numbers. Vol. I: Divisibility and primality. New York: Dover Publications. ISBN 978-0-486-44232-7. MR 0245499.
- — (2005) [1920]. History of the theory of numbers. Vol. II: Diophantine analysis. New York: Dover Publications. ISBN 978-0-486-44233-4. MR 0245500.
- — (2005) [1923]. History of the theory of numbers. Vol. III: Quadratic and higher forms. New York: Dover Publications. ISBN 978-0-486-44234-1. MR 0245501.
- — (2009) [1922]. First course in the theory of equations. University of Michigan Library.
- — (1960) [1923]. Algebras and their arithmetics. New York: Dover Publications. MR 0111764.
- — (1926). Modern algebraic theories.
- — (1923–1928). Algebraic Numbers. Report with others for U. S. National Research Council.
- — (1929). Introduction to the Theory of Numbers.
- — (1930). Studies in the Theory of Numbers.
- —; Bliss, G. A. (1935). Biographical Memoir of Eliakim Hastings Moore 1862–1932.
- — (1935). Researches on Waring's problem.
- —; Blichfeldt, Hans Frederick; Miller, George Abram (1938). Theory and Applications of Finite Groups.
- — (1938) [1923]. Algebras And Their Arithmetics.
- — (1939). Modern Elementary Theory of Numbers.
- — (1939). New First Course in the Theory of Equations.
- —. Plane Trigonometry With Practical Applications.
- — (1975). Albert, A. Adrian (ed.). The collected mathematical papers of Leonard Eugene Dickson. Vol. I–VI. New York: AMS Chelsea Publishing. ISBN 978-0-8284-0273-6. MR 0749229. MR 0441665
