= Srivastava code =

Class of error correction code

In coding theory, Srivastava codes, formulated by Professor J. N. Srivastava, form a class of parameterised error-correcting codes which are a special case of alternant codes.

== Definition ==
The original Srivastava code over GF(q) of length n is defined by a parity check matrix H of alternant form

$$\begin{bmatrix}
\frac{\alpha_1^\mu}{\alpha_1-w_1} & \cdots & \frac{\alpha_n^\mu}{\alpha_n-w_1} \\
\vdots & \ddots & \vdots \\
\frac{\alpha_1^\mu}{\alpha_1-w_s} & \cdots & \frac{\alpha_n^\mu}{\alpha_n-w_s} \\
\end{bmatrix}$$

where the α_{i} and z_{i} are elements of GF(q^{m})

== Properties ==
The parameters of this code are length n, dimension ≥ n − ms and minimum distance ≥ s + 1.

== Related constructions ==
The symmetry properties of Srivastava-code parity-check matrices have been used to construct binary codes, including a construction that generalizes Goppa's construction.
