= Alternating polynomial =

In algebra, an alternating polynomial is a polynomial $f(x_1,\dots,x_n)$ such that if one switches any two of the variables, the polynomial changes sign:

$$f(x_1,\dots,x_j,\dots,x_i,\dots,x_n) = -f(x_1,\dots,x_i,\dots,x_j,\dots,x_n).$$

Equivalently, if one permutes the variables, the polynomial changes in value by the sign of the permutation:

$$f\left(x_{\sigma(1)},\dots,x_{\sigma(n)}\right)= \mathrm{sgn}(\sigma) f(x_1,\dots,x_n).$$

More generally, a polynomial $f(x_1,\dots,x_n,y_1,\dots,y_t)$ is said to be alternating in $x_1,\dots,x_n$ if it changes sign if one switches any two of the $x_i$, leaving the $y_j$ fixed.

== Relation to symmetric polynomials ==
Products of symmetric and alternating polynomials (in the same variables $x_1,\dots,x_n$) behave thus:

- the product of two symmetric polynomials is symmetric,
- the product of a symmetric polynomial and an alternating polynomial is alternating, and
- the product of two alternating polynomials is symmetric.

This is exactly the addition table for parity, with "symmetric" corresponding to "even" and "alternating" corresponding to "odd". Thus, the direct sum of the spaces of symmetric and alternating polynomials forms a superalgebra (a $\mathbf{Z}_2$-graded algebra), where the symmetric polynomials are the even part, and the alternating polynomials are the odd part. This grading is unrelated to the grading of polynomials by degree.

In particular, alternating polynomials form a module over the algebra of symmetric polynomials (the odd part of a superalgebra is a module over the even part); in fact it is a free module of rank 1, with the Vandermonde polynomial in n variables as generator.

If the characteristic of the coefficient ring is 2, there is no difference between the two concepts: the alternating polynomials are precisely the symmetric polynomials.

== Vandermonde polynomial ==
The basic alternating polynomial is the Vandermonde polynomial:

$$v_n = \prod_{1\le i<j\le n} (x_j-x_i).$$

This is clearly alternating, as switching two variables changes the sign of one term and does not change the others.

The alternating polynomials are exactly the Vandermonde polynomial times a symmetric polynomial: $a = v_n \cdot s$ where $s$ is symmetric. This is because:

- $v_n$ is a factor of every alternating polynomial: $(x_j-x_i)$ is a factor of every alternating polynomial, as if $x_i=x_j$, the polynomial is zero (since switching them does not change the polynomial, we get

$$f(x_1,\dots,x_i,\dots,x_j,\dots,x_n) = f(x_1,\dots,x_j,\dots,x_i,\dots,x_n) = -f(x_1,\dots,x_i,\dots,x_j,\dots,x_n),$$

so $(x_j-x_i)$ is a factor), and thus $v_n$ is a factor.

- an alternating polynomial times a symmetric polynomial is an alternating polynomial; thus all multiples of $v_n$ are alternating polynomials

Conversely, the ratio of two alternating polynomials is a symmetric function, possibly rational (not necessarily a polynomial), though the ratio of an alternating polynomial over the Vandermonde polynomial is a polynomial. Schur polynomials are defined in this way, as an alternating polynomial divided by the Vandermonde polynomial.

=== Ring structure ===
Thus, denoting the ring of symmetric polynomials by Λ_{n}, the ring of symmetric and alternating polynomials is $\Lambda_n[v_n]$, or more precisely $\Lambda_n[v_n]/\langle v_n^2-\Delta\rangle$, where $\Delta=v_n^2$ is a symmetric polynomial, the discriminant.

That is, the ring of symmetric and alternating polynomials is a quadratic extension of the ring of symmetric polynomials, where one has adjoined a square root of the discriminant.

Alternatively, it is:

$$R[e_1,\dots,e_n,v_n]/\langle v_n^2-\Delta\rangle.$$

If 2 is not invertible, the situation is somewhat different, and one must use a different polynomial $W_n$, and obtains a different relation; see Romagny.

== Representation theory ==
From the perspective of representation theory, the symmetric and alternating polynomials are subrepresentations of the action of the symmetric group on n letters on the polynomial ring in n variables. (Formally, the symmetric group acts on n letters, and thus acts on derived objects, particularly free objects on n letters, such as the ring of polynomials.)

The symmetric group has two 1-dimensional representations: the trivial representation and the sign representation. The symmetric polynomials are the trivial representation, and the alternating polynomials are the sign representation. Formally, the scalar span of any symmetric (resp., alternating) polynomial is a trivial (resp., sign) representation of the symmetric group, and multiplying the polynomials tensors the representations.

In characteristic 2, these are not distinct representations, and the analysis is more complicated.

If $n>2$, there are also other subrepresentations of the action of the symmetric group on the ring of polynomials, as discussed in representation theory of the symmetric group.

== Unstable ==
Alternating polynomials are an unstable phenomenon: the ring of symmetric polynomials in n variables can be obtained from the ring of symmetric polynomials in arbitrarily many variables by evaluating all variables above $x_n$ to zero: symmetric polynomials are thus stable or compatibly defined. However, this is not the case for alternating polynomials, in particular the Vandermonde polynomial.

== See also ==
- Symmetric polynomial
- Euler class
