= Marie Litzinger =

American mathematician (1899–1952)

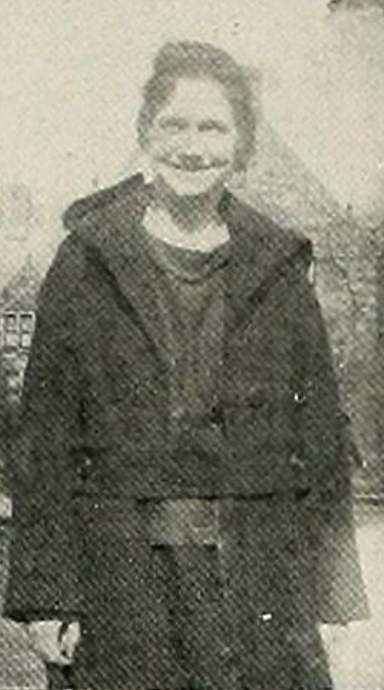
- Marie Litzinger, from the 1920 yearbook of Bryn Mawr College
- Born: May 14, 1899; Bedford, Pennsylvania
- Died: April 7, 1952; Bedford, Pennsylvania
- Occupation(s): Mathematician, college professor
- Scientific career
- Thesis: A Basis for Residual Polynomials in n Variables (1934)
- Doctoral advisor: Leonard Eugene Dickson

Marie Litzinger (May 14, 1899 – April 7, 1952) was an American mathematician known for her research in number theory, homogeneous polynomials, and modular arithmetic.

== Early life and education ==
Marie Litzinger was born in Bedford, Pennsylvania, the daughter of Rush Litzinger and Katherine O'Connell Litzinger. Her father owned a marble works, and was an accountant for the Pennsylvania Railroad.

Litzinger earned her bachelor's degree and master's degree at Bryn Mawr College in 1920 and 1922, respectively. She won the college's European Fellowship in 1920. She completed her Ph.D. at the University of Chicago in 1934. Her doctoral advisor was Leonard Eugene Dickson, one of the first American researchers in abstract algebra. Her dissertation was titled "A Basis for Residual Polynomials in n Variables."

== Career ==
While studying, Litzinger taught mathematics at secondary institutions, before becoming an instructor at Mount Holyoke College in 1925, where she remained for the rest of her career and rose to the rank of full professor in 1942. She also served as department chair. She was a member of the American Mathematical Society, among other professional societies.

== Personal life ==
Litzinger died in her hometown, Bedford, Pennsylvania, in 1952, aged 52 years.

== Papers ==
The Marie P. Litzinger Papers, which consist of Litzinger's college correspondence and photographs, are held at Bryn Mawr College with the Collection Identifier BMC-M124.
