= Gordon Pall =

Canadian mathematician

Gordon Pall (26 December 1907 – December 1987) was a Canadian mathematician. In 1945, he and Lloyd Williams founded the Canadian Mathematical Congress.

== Education and career ==
Gordon Pall earned a B.A. at the University of Manitoba in 1926, an M.A. at the University of Toronto in 1927, and a Ph.D. in 1929 under Leonard Eugene Dickson with the dissertation "Problems in Additive Theory of Numbers" at the University of Chicago, Ph.D., 1929.

In 1931, he became a lecturer in mathematics at McGill University, becoming an assistant professor in 1934. In 1946, he was appointed to a professorship at Illinois Institute of Technology.

== Selected publications ==
- On Generalized Quaternions Transactions of the American Mathematical Society, 59 (1946), pp. 280–332
- Discriminantal Divisors of Binary Quadratic Forms, Journal of Number Theory, Vol 1, Issue 4, October 1969, Pages 525-533
