= J. N. Srivastava =

Indian mathematician (1933–2010)

Jagdish Narain Srivastava (1933–2010) was an Indian-born mathematician, statistician and a professor at Colorado State University. Srivastava is known for the research in the area of Design of experiments, Multivariate analysis and Combinatorial mathematics. Srivastava was a Fellow of Institute of Mathematical Statistics.

J. N. Srivastava received a Ph.D. in 1962 from the University of North Carolina at Chapel Hill. Prof. R. C. Bose was Srivastava's advisor. He joined Colorado State University in 1966.

He was known for his contributions in design of experiments as well as in multivariate analysis, survey sampling, reliability, coding theory, combinatorial theory, and other areas of statistics and mathematics. Srivastava code was invented by him.

Gödel's incompleteness theorems inspired him to recognize the limitations of science. He slowly turned toward spirituality and studied all the major religions of the world. This led him to obtain his 1991 joint appointment in the philosophy department of CSU.

After his retirement, he moved to California. He died on 18 November 2010. He is survived by his wife of sixty years Usha, son Arvind, daughter Gita and son-in-law Roy; son Ashok, daughter-in-law Lynn and granddaughter Leela.
