= Cyrus Colton MacDuffee =

American mathematician (1895–1961

Cyrus Colton MacDuffee (June 29, 1895 – August 21, 1961) from Oneida, New York was a professor of mathematics at University of Wisconsin. He wrote a number of influential research papers in abstract algebra. MacDuffee served on the Council of the American Mathematical Society (A.M.S.), was editor of the Transactions of the A.M.S., and served as president of the Mathematical Association of America (M.A.A).

MacDuffee obtained his B.S. degree in 1917 from Colgate University and a Ph.D. in 1922 from the University of Chicago; his thesis was on Nonassociative algebras under the direction of Leonard E. Dickson. In 1935, MacDuffee joined the University of Wisconsin, where he remained until his death in 1961. He served as chair of the department (1951–56). Later, Wisconsin endowed a university chair under his name. Prior to joining the University of Wisconsin, he served at Princeton and Ohio State. He guided 30 Ph.D. students, among them D. R. Fulkerson, H. J. Ryser, and Bonnie Stewart and Grace Shover Quinn.

MacDuffee's daughter Helen became a statistician at Oregon State University and the mayor of Corvallis, Oregon.

== Bibliography ==
- MacDuffee, CC (1933). The Theory of Matrices. Berlin: Springer. (2nd ed., 1946). The Theory of Matrices (2004 reprint) at Google Books
- MacDuffee, CC (1940). An introduction to abstract algebra. New York: Wiley.
- MacDuffee, CC (1943). Vectors and matrices. number 7 of Carus Mathematical Monographs. Ithaca, New York: Mathematical Association of America.
- MacDuffee, CC (1954). Theory of equations. New York: Wiley.

== See also ==
- Latimer–MacDuffee theorem
