= Alternant code =

Class of error correction code

In coding theory, alternant codes form a class of parameterised error-correcting codes which generalise the BCH codes.

== Definition ==
An alternant code over GF(q) of length n is defined by a parity check matrix H of alternant form H_{i,j} = α_{j}^{i}y_{i}, where the α_{j} are distinct elements of the extension GF(q^{m}), the y_{i} are further non-zero parameters again in the extension GF(q^{m}) and the indices range as i from 0 to δ − 1, j from 1 to n.

== Properties ==
The parameters of this alternant code are length n, dimension ≥ n − mδ and minimum distance ≥ δ + 1. There exist long alternant codes which meet the Gilbert–Varshamov bound.

The class of alternant codes includes

- BCH codes
- Goppa codes
- Srivastava codes
