= Latimer–MacDuffee theorem =

Theorem in abstract algebra

The Latimer–MacDuffee theorem is a theorem in abstract algebra, a branch of mathematics. It is named after Claiborne Latimer and Cyrus Colton MacDuffee, who published it in 1933. Significant contributions to its theory were made later by Olga Taussky-Todd.

Let $f$ be a monic, irreducible polynomial of degree $n$. The Latimer–MacDuffee theorem gives a one-to-one correspondence between $\mathbb{Z}$-similarity classes of $n\times n$ matrices with characteristic polynomial $f$ and the ideal classes in the order

$$\mathbb{Z}[x]/(f(x)).$$

where ideals are considered equivalent if they are equal up to an overall (nonzero) rational scalar multiple. (Note that this order need not be the full ring of integers, so nonzero ideals need not be invertible.) Since an order in a number field has only finitely many ideal classes (even if it is not the maximal order, and we mean here ideals classes for all nonzero ideals, not just the invertible ones), it follows that there are only finitely many conjugacy classes of matrices over the integers with characteristic polynomial $f(x)$.
