= Helen Berg =

American statistician and politician

Mayor of Corvallis, Oregon
- In office 1994–2006
- Preceded by: Charles Vars
- Succeeded by: Charlie Tomlinson

Personal details
- Born: July 15, 1932 Columbus, Ohio
- Died: August 13, 2010 (aged 78) Portland, Oregon
- Spouses: Norman Ward (1952); William Lowry (1965–1976; divorced); Alan Berg (1983–1989; his death)
- Parent: Cyrus Colton MacDuffee (father)
- Education: U. of Wisconsin (BS 1953); Oregon State U. (MS 1973)
- Profession: Statistician, politician

Helen M. Berg (née Helen Sewirr MacDuffee; July 15, 1932 – August 13, 2010) was an American statistician and politician. Berg served as the first female mayor of Corvallis, Oregon, from 1994 until 2006, and was the longest-serving mayor of Corvallis to date.

== Education and academic career ==
Berg studied at Wellesley College before completing a bachelor's degree in mathematics at the University of Wisconsin–Madison in 1953. She moved to Corvallis in 1957 and began working as a statistician at Oregon State University in 1963, initially as an operator of electromechanical calculators in the Agricultural Experiment Station. The work sparked her interest in statistics, and she began taking courses on the subject, eventually completing a master's degree in statistics in 1973. She then spent two years as a researcher at the University of Illinois, working half-time with the Department of Economics there and half-time in the Bureau of Economic and Business Research. She returned to Corvallis in 1975, and became the director of the Survey Research Center at Oregon State. She continued to work as the center's director, also teaching statistics classes at the university, until her retirement in 1993.

Her research, published in many journal papers both as Helen M. Lowry and as Helen M. Berg, concerned feminist economics and "the statistical differences of social opportunity by gender". One of her frequent collaborators, beginning with her work at the University of Illinois, was Marianne Ferber, with whom she published well-cited work on factors affecting male versus female graduate student success, and on gender pay gaps.

== Political career ==
Berg served on the Corvallis city council, representing Ward 7, for two consecutive terms from 1991 until 1994. Her work as councillor included sponsoring a 1991 city ordinance against discrimination on the basis of sexual orientation.

=== Mayor of Corvallis ===
Berg successfully ran for her first term as mayor of Corvallis in 1994 when she was 62 years old. Berg became Corvallis' first female mayor and would ultimately become the longest-serving mayor of the city to date. She would hold office for three consecutive terms, until her retirement in 2006.

An issue that she was forced to handle early in her time as mayor was a local housing shortage caused by job growth in local industry. Later, she had to handle large budget cuts caused by the stock market downturn of 2002.

Under Berg's three-term tenure, four new fire stations were constructed. The city's largest public works project in its history, the $30 million sewer overflow remediation project, was completed, which stopped sewage and storm runoff from being dumped into the Willamette River. The city completed a long term development plan called the Corvallis 2020 Vision Statesmen. Berg oversaw the planning and construction of the Howland Plaza at Riverfront Commemorative Park, which opened in May 2004. The Corvallis Police Department was also accredited by the Commission on Accreditation for Law Enforcement Agencies, a distinction shared by only 2% of American police departments at the time.

Berg retired from office in 2006 after three terms. She was succeeded as mayor by Charlie Tomlinson, whom she had previously defeated in the 2003 mayoral election.

== Personal life ==
Berg was born in Columbus, Ohio, one of four children of mathematics professor Cyrus Colton MacDuffee and his wife Mary Augusta Bean; her mother also had bachelor's and master's degrees in mathematics. She moved to multiple parts of the US as a child, eventually finishing high school in Madison, Wisconsin. She was a Unitarian Universalist.

She interrupted her undergraduate studies to marry Norman Ward in 1952; he became an engineer for CH2M in Corvallis, and they had a son and a daughter. In 1965, she married William P. Lowry, a biometeorologist and climatologist then on the Oregon State faculty; they filed for divorce in 1976. In 1983, Berg married her third husband, Alan Berg. He was a forestry professor at Oregon State who had served on the Corvallis city council from 1973 to 1978 and served as mayor from 1979 to 1986; he died in 1989.

In 1993, Berg donated to the local Audubon Society over 5 acres (2.0 ha) of land near Corvallis on which she had pastured horses. The land became the Hesthavn Nature Center, named by Berg from the Norwegian language word for a horse haven.

Berg moved to Portland, Oregon, in 2007 soon after leaving office to be closer to her family. In 2008, the United States House of Representatives passed a bill to name a post office after her, but it was tabled in the senate. She died on August 13, 2010, in Portland, of the asbestos-related disease peritoneal mesothelioma at the age of 78. In 2011, a plaza in Riverfront Commemorative Park in Corvallis was renamed the Helen M. Berg Plaza in her memory. Her papers are kept in the special collections of the Oregon State University library.
