= History of the Theory of Numbers =

Book by Leonard Eugene Dickson

- Cover of the first edition
- Author: L. E. Dickson
- Language: English
- Publisher: Carnegie Institution of Washington
- Publication date: 1919
- Publication place: United States
- Media type: Print (hardback)
- Pages: Vol I: 486, Vol II: 803, Vol III: 313
- ISBN: 978-0-486-44232-7 (vol.1); ISBN 978-0-486-44233-4(vol.2); ISBN 978-0-486-44234-1(vol.3)

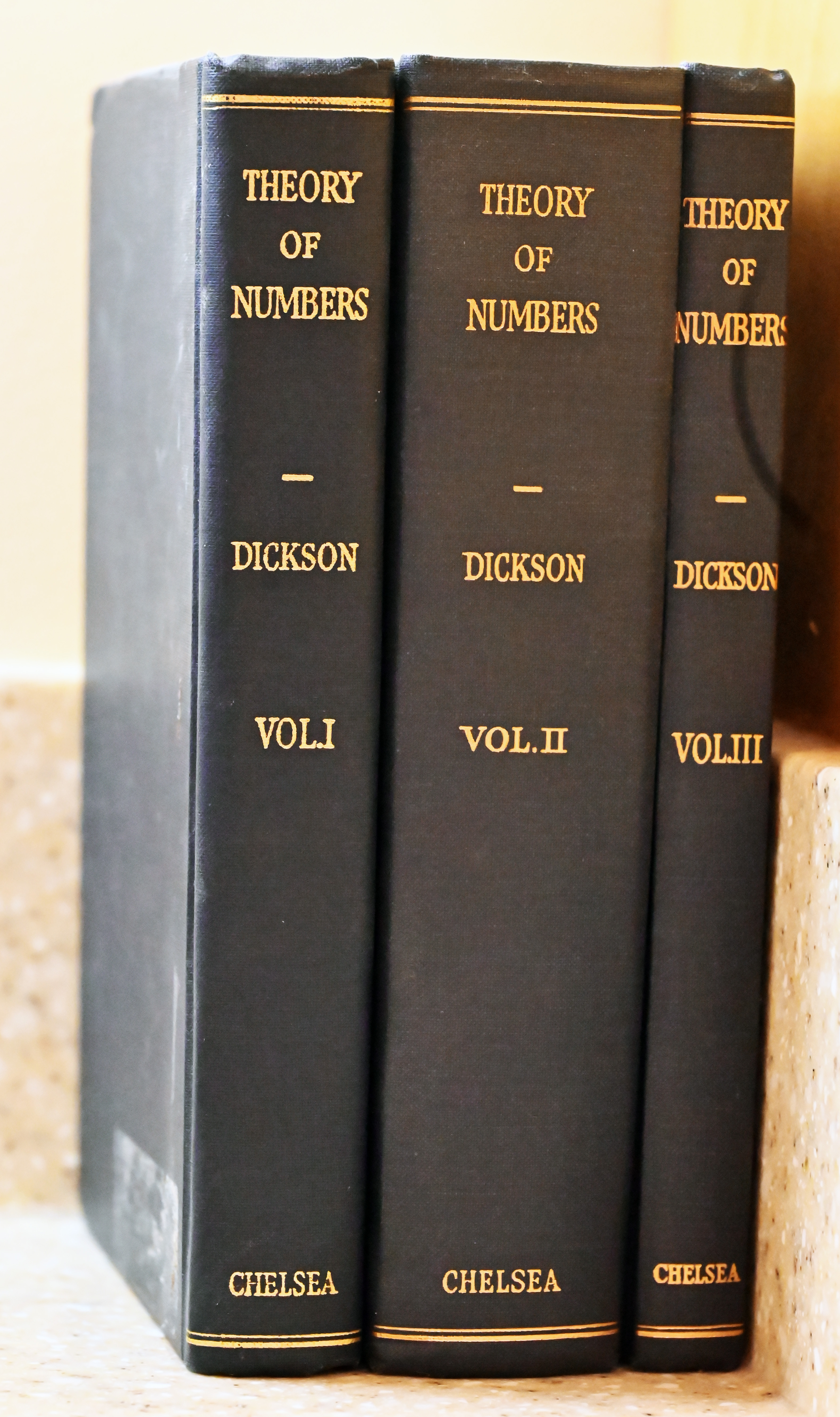
By Chelsa publishing

History of the Theory of Numbers is a three-volume work by Leonard Eugene Dickson summarizing work in number theory up to about 1920. The style is unusual in that Dickson mostly just lists results by various authors, with little further discussion. The central topic of quadratic reciprocity and higher reciprocity laws is barely mentioned; this was apparently going to be the topic of a fourth volume that was never written (Fenster 1999).

== Volumes ==
- Volume 1 - Divisibility and Primality - 486 pages
- Volume 2 - Diophantine Analysis - 803 pages
- Volume 3 - Quadratic and Higher Forms - 313 pages
