= Claiborne Latimer =

American mathematician (1893–1960)

Claiborne Green Latimer (1893–1960) was an American mathematician, known for the Latimer–MacDuffee theorem.

== Career ==
Latimer earned his PhD in 1924 from the University of Chicago under Leonard Dickson with thesis Arithmetic of Generalized Quaternion Algebras. He was an assistant professor at Tulane University for 2 years, before becoming a mathematics professor at the University of Kentucky in 1927. After 20 years at the University of Kentucky, he resigned in 1947 and became a professor at Emory University. Latimer was an amateur photographer; some of his photographs are preserved in the archives of the University of Kentucky and Emory University.
