= Józef Maria Hoene-Wroński =

Polish philosopher (1776–1853)

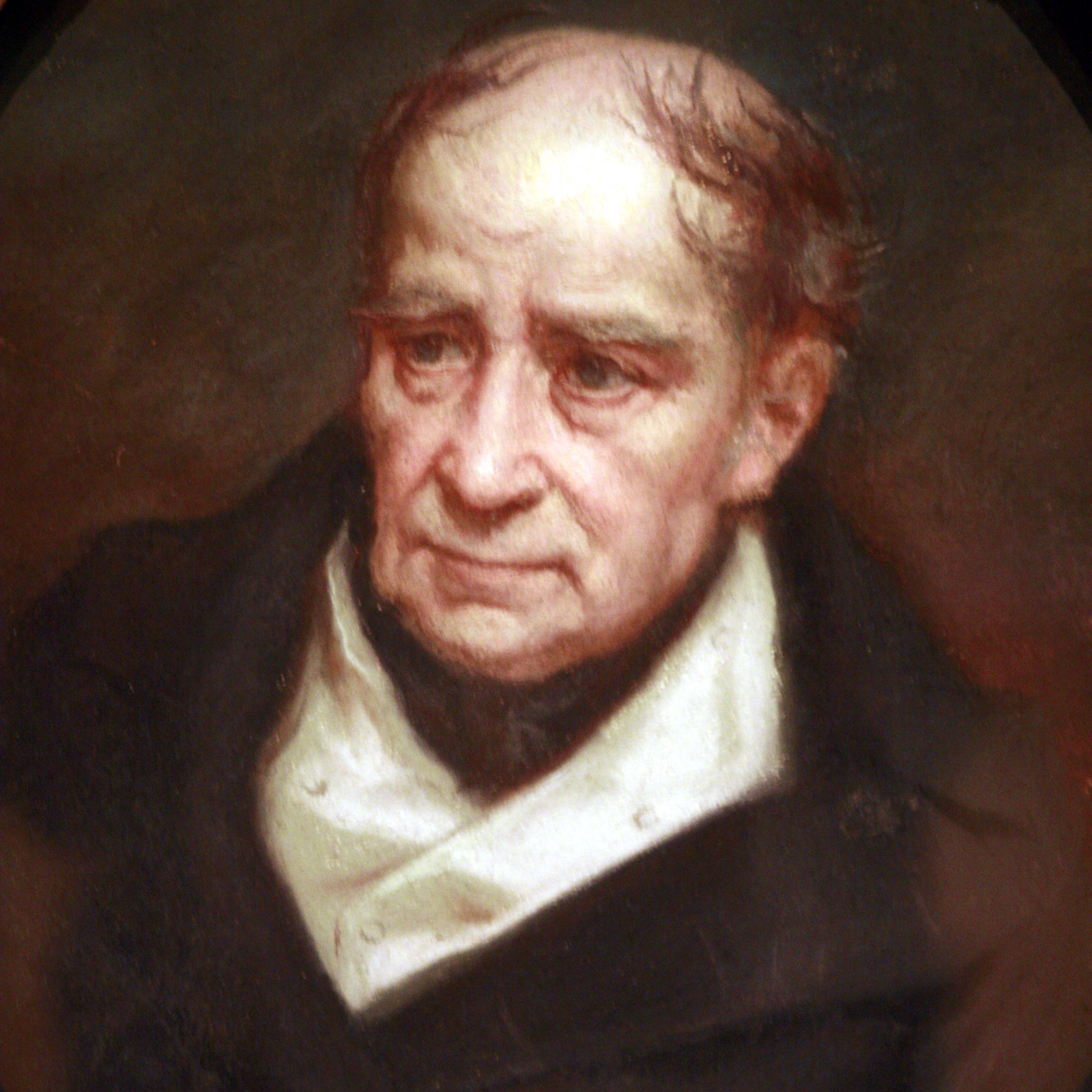
- Józef Maria Hoene-Wroński, by Laurent-Charles Maréchal, 1845
- Born: Josef Hoëné; 23 August 1778; Wolsztyn, Poznań Province, Polish–Lithuanian Commonwealth
- Died: 9 August 1853 (aged 76); Neuilly-sur-Seine, France
- Other name: Josef Hoëné-Wronski

Philosophical work
- Era: 19th-century philosophy
- Region: Western philosophy Polish philosophy French philosophy
- School: Polish messianism
- Main interests: Philosophy, mathematics, physics, engineering, law, occultism, economics
- Notable ideas: Wronskian; Polish Messianism; Continuous track

Józef Maria Hoene-Wroński (/ˈhoʊnə ˈvrɒnski/; Polish: [ˈjuzɛf ˈxɛnɛ ˈvrɔj̃skʲi]; French: Josef Hoëné-Wronski [ʒozɛf ɔɛne vʁɔ̃ski]; 23 August 1778 – 9 August 1853) was a Polish messianist philosopher, mathematician, physicist, inventor, lawyer, occultist and economist. Trained as an officer in the army of the Polish-Lithuanian Commonwealth, he participated in the Polish–Russian War of 1792 and the Kościuszko Uprising.

In mathematics, he is known for introducing a novel series expansion for a function in response to Joseph Louis Lagrange's use of infinite series. The coefficients in Wroński's new series form the Wronskian, a determinant Thomas Muir named in 1882. As an inventor, he is credited with designing some of the first caterpillar vehicles.

== Life and work ==
He was born as Hoëné in 1778 but changed his name in 1815 to Józef Wroński. Later in life he changed his name to Józef Maria Hoene-Wroński, without using his family's original French spelling Hoëné. At no point in his life, neither in Polish or French, was he known as Hoëné-Wroński; nor was the common French transliteration, Josef Hoëné-Wronski, ever his official name in his native Poland (though it might have served as his chosen French nom de plume on some work).

His father, Antoni Höhne (pl, de), was the municipal architect of Poznań. Antoni originally came from the small Bohemian village of Leukersdorf (present-day Čermná which is now a part of Libouchec). In later life, he settled in western Poland marrying Elżbieta Pernicka in Wolsztyn in 1773. In the same place and a few years later on, in 1778, their son Józef Maria was born. Józef was educated in Poznań and Warsaw. In 1794 he served in Poland's Kościuszko Uprising as a second lieutenant of artillery, was taken prisoner, and remained until 1797 in the Russian Army. After resigning in the rank of lieutenant colonel in 1798, he studied in the Holy Roman Empire until 1800, when he enlisted in the Polish Legion at Marseille. There he began his scientific and scholarly work and conceived the idea of a great philosophical system. Ten years later he moved to Paris where he would spend most of his life working unremittingly to the last in the most difficult material circumstances.

He wrote exclusively in French, in the desire that his ideas, of whose immortality he was convinced, be accessible to all; he worked, he said, "through France for Poland." He published over a hundred works, and left many more in manuscript; at 75 years of age and nearing death, he exclaimed: "God Almighty, there's still so much more I wanted to say!"

In science, Hoene-Wroński set himself the task of the complete reform of philosophy as well as that of mathematics, astronomy and technology. He elaborated not only a system of philosophy, but also applications to politics, history, economics, law, psychology, music and pedagogy. It was his aspiration to reform human knowledge in an "absolute, that is, ultimate" manner.

In 1803, Wroński joined the Marseille Observatory, and began developing an enormously complex theory of the structure and origin of the universe. During this period, he took up a correspondence with nearly all of the major scientists and mathematicians of his day, and was well respected at the observatory. In 1803 Wroński "experienced a mystical illumination, which he regarded as the discovery of the Absolute."

In 1810, he published the results of his scientific research in a massive tome, which he advocated as a new foundation for all of science and mathematics. His theories were strongly Pythagorean, holding numbers and their properties to be the fundamental underpinning of essentially everything in the universe. His claims were met with little acceptance, and his research and theories were generally dismissed as grandiose rubbish. His earlier correspondence with major figures meant that his writings garnered more attention than a typical crackpot theory, even earning a review from the great mathematician Joseph Louis Lagrange (which turned out to be categorically unfavorable). In the ensuing controversy, he was forced to leave the observatory.

He immediately turned his focus towards applying philosophy to mathematics (his critics believed that this meant dispensing with mathematical rigor in favor of generalities). In 1812, he published a paper purporting to show that every equation has an algebraic solution, directly contradicting results which had been recently published by Paolo Ruffini; Ruffini turned out to be correct.

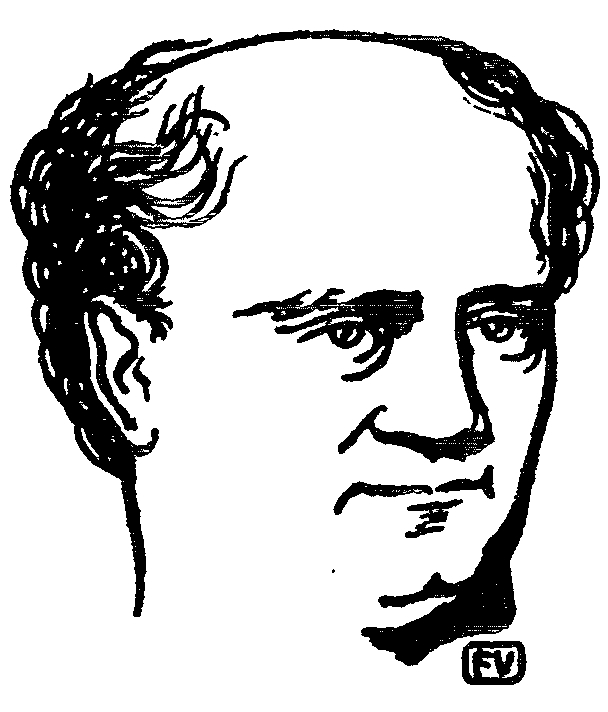
Portrait by Félix Vallotton

He later turned his attention to disparate and largely unsuccessful pursuits such as a fantastical design for caterpillar-like vehicles which he intended to replace railroad transportation, but did not manage to persuade anyone to give the design serious attention. In 1819, he travelled to England in an attempt to obtain financial backing from the Board of Longitude to build a device to determine longitude at sea. After initial difficulties, he was given an opportunity to address the Board, but his pretentious address, On the Longitude, contained much philosophizing and generalities, but no concrete plans for a working device, and thus failed to gain any support from the Board. He remained for several years in England and, in 1821, published an introductory text on mathematics in London, which moderately improved his financial situation.

In 1822, he returned to France, and again took up a combination of mathematics and far-fetched ideas, despite being in poverty and scorned by intellectual society. Along with his continuing Pythagorean obsession, he spent much time working on several notoriously futile endeavors, including attempts to build a perpetual motion machine, to square the circle and to build a machine to predict the future (which he dubbed the prognometre). In 1852, shortly before his death, he did find a willing audience for his ideas: the occultist Eliphas Levi who met Wroński and was greatly impressed and "attracted by his religious and scientific utopianism." Wroński was "a powerful catalyst" for Levi's occultism.

Wroński died in 1853 in Neuilly-sur-Seine, France, on the outskirts of Paris.

== Legacy ==
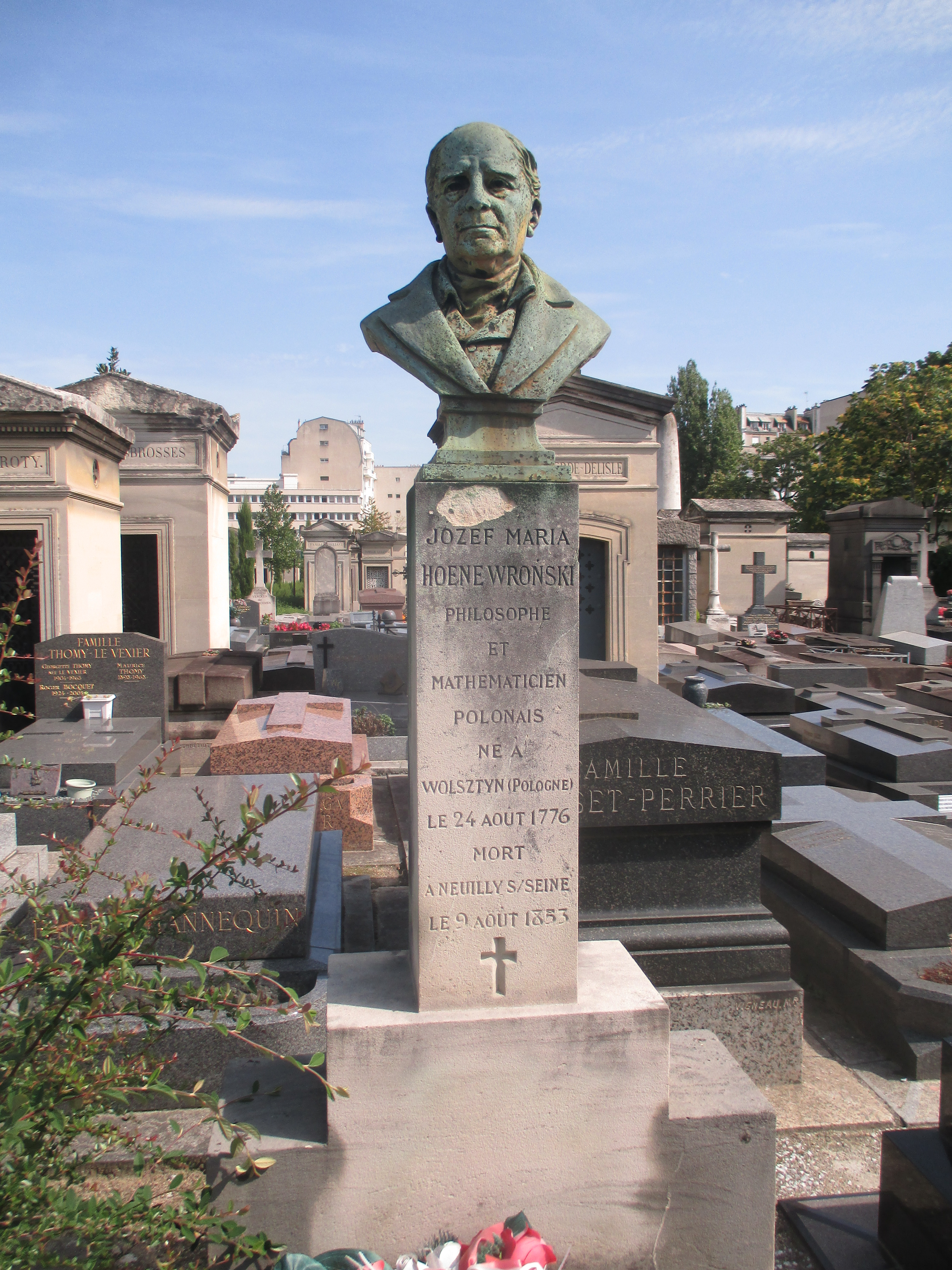
His grave in the Old Neuilly-sur-Seine community cemetery.

During his lifetime, nearly all his work was dismissed as nonsense. However, some of it came to be regarded in a more favourable light in later years. Although most of his inflated claims were groundless, his mathematical work contains flashes of deep insight and many important intermediary results, the most significant of which was his work on series. He had strongly criticized Lagrange for his use of infinite series, introducing instead a novel series expansion for a function. His criticisms of Lagrange were for the most part unfounded but the coefficients in Wroński's new series proved important after his death, forming a determinant now known as the Wronskian (the name which Thomas Muir had given them in 1882).

The level of Wroński's scientific and scholarly accomplishments and the amplitude of his objectives placed Wroński in the first rank of European metaphysicians in the early 19th century. But the abstract formalism and obscurity of his thought, the difficulty of his language, his boundless self-assurance and his uncompromising judgments of others alienated him from most of the scientific community. He was perhaps the most original of the Polish metaphysicians, but others were more representative of the Polish outlook.

== Works ==
Books

- 1801 - Mémoires sur l'aberration des astres mobiles, et sur l'inégalité dans l'apparence de leur mouvement, par J. Hoehné
- 1803 - Philosophie critique découverte par Kant, fondée sur le dernier principe du savoir, par J. Hoehne
- 1811 - Introduction à la philosophie des mathématiques, et technie de l'algorithmie, par M. Hoëné de Wronski
- 1811 - Programme du cours de philosophie transcendantale, par M. Hoëné Wronski
- 1812 - Résolution générale des équations de tous les degrés], par Hoëné Wronski
- 1812 - Réfutation de la théorie des fonctions analytiques de Lagrange, par Hoëné Wronski
- 1814 - Philosophie de l'Infini, par Hoëné Wronski
- 1818 - Introduction à un ouvrage intitulé Le Sphinx, ou la Nomothétique séhélienne, par Hoëné Wronski
- 1821 - A Course of mathematics, by Höené Wronski. Translated from the original French under the inspection of the author. London, 1821.
- 1827 - Canons de logarithmes de H. W.
- 1828 - Loi téléologique du hasard. Deuxième aperçu. Signé : Hoëné Wronski. Paris, le 13 avril 1828.
- 1831 - Messianisme, union finale de la philosophie et de la religion constituant la philosophie absolue (1831-1839)
- 1831 - Prodrome du Messianisme; Révélation des destinées de l’humanité
- 1832 - Réflexions philosophiques sur un miroir parabolique
- 1833 - Loi téléologique du Hasard: réimpression de trois pièces rarissimes (1833); précédée d'une autobiographie et d'un inventaire de l'œuvre Hoëné Wronski
- 1833 - Resolution of equation polynomials of tous les degries (in anglishe)
- 1837 - Rails mobiles, ou chemins de fer mouvans, de Hoëné Wroński
- 1840 - Secret politique de Napoléon comme base de l'avenir moral du monde, par Hoëné Wronski
- 1844 - Urgente réforme des Chemins de fer et de toute la locomotion terrestre, par Hoëné Wronski
- 1853 - Secret politique de Napoléon, par Hoëné Wronski, comme introduction à sa récente "Philosophie de l'histoire". Nouvelle édition

Letters

- 1851 - Épître à Sa Majesté l'Empereur de Russie, pour compléter les "Cent pages décisives", et pour accomplir la réforme de la mécanique céleste". Signé : Hoëné Wroński. Metz, 1851
- 1851 - Épitre secrète a Son Altesse le prince Louis-Napoléon président de la République Française sur les destinées de la France

== See also ==
- List of Poles
- Timeline of Polish science and technology

== Sources ==
- Władysław Tatarkiewicz, Historia filozofii (History of Philosophy), 3 vols., Warsaw, Państwowe Wydawnictwo Naukowe, 1978.
