= Alternant matrix =

In linear algebra, an alternant matrix is a matrix formed by applying a finite list of functions pointwise to a fixed column of inputs. An alternant determinant is the determinant of a square alternant matrix.

Generally, if $f_1, f_2, \dots, f_n$ are functions from a set $X$ to a field $F$, and ${\alpha_1, \alpha_2, \ldots, \alpha_m} \in X$, then the alternant matrix has size $m \times n$ and is defined by

$$M=\begin{bmatrix}
f_1(\alpha_1) & f_2(\alpha_1) & \cdots & f_n(\alpha_1)\\
f_1(\alpha_2) & f_2(\alpha_2) & \cdots & f_n(\alpha_2)\\
f_1(\alpha_3) & f_2(\alpha_3) & \cdots & f_n(\alpha_3)\\
\vdots & \vdots & \ddots &\vdots \\
f_1(\alpha_m) & f_2(\alpha_m) & \cdots & f_n(\alpha_m)\\
\end{bmatrix}$$

or, more compactly, $M_{ij} = f_j(\alpha_i)$. (Some authors use the transpose of the above matrix.) Examples of alternant matrices include Vandermonde matrices, for which $f_j(\alpha)=\alpha^{j-1}$, and Moore matrices, for which $f_j(\alpha)=\alpha^{q^{j-1}}$.

== Properties ==
- The alternant can be used to check the linear independence of the functions $f_1, f_2, \dots, f_n$ in function space. For example, let $f_1(x) = \sin(x)$, $f_2(x) = \cos(x)$ and choose $\alpha_1 = 0, \alpha_2 = \pi/2$. Then the alternant is the matrix $\left[\begin{smallmatrix}0 & 1 \\ 1 & 0 \end{smallmatrix}\right]$ and the alternant determinant is $-1 \neq 0$. Therefore M is invertible and the vectors $\{\sin(x), \cos(x)\}$ form a basis for their spanning set: in particular, $\sin(x)$ and $\cos(x)$ are linearly independent.
- Linear dependence of the columns of an alternant does not imply that the functions are linearly dependent in function space. For example, let $f_1(x) = \sin(x)$, $f_2 = \cos(x)$ and choose $\alpha_1 = 0, \alpha_2 = \pi$. Then the alternant is $\left[\begin{smallmatrix}0 & 1 \\ 0 & -1 \end{smallmatrix}\right]$ and the alternant determinant is 0, but we have already seen that $\sin(x)$ and $\cos(x)$ are linearly independent.
- Despite this, the alternant can be used to find a linear dependence if it is already known that one exists. For example, we know from the theory of partial fractions that there are real numbers A and B for which $\frac{A}{x+1} + \frac{B}{x+2} = \frac{1}{(x+1)(x+2)}$. Choosing $f_1(x) = \frac{1}{x+1}$, $f_2(x) = \frac{1}{x+2}$, $f_3(x) = \frac{1}{(x+1)(x+2)}$ and $(\alpha_1,\alpha_2,\alpha_3) = (1,2,3)$, we obtain the alternant
  $$\begin{bmatrix} 1/2 & 1/3 & 1/6 \\ 1/3 & 1/4 & 1/12 \\ 1/4 & 1/5 & 1/20 \end{bmatrix} \sim \begin{bmatrix} 1 & 0 & 1 \\ 0 & 1 & -1 \\ 0 & 0 & 0 \end{bmatrix}$$
  . Therefore, $(1,-1,-1)$ is in the nullspace of the matrix: that is, $f_1 - f_2 - f_3 = 0$. Moving $f_3$ to the other side of the equation gives the partial fraction decomposition $A = 1, B = -1$.
- If $n = m$ and $\alpha_i = \alpha_j$ for any $i \neq j$, then the alternant determinant is zero (as a row is repeated).
- If $n = m$ and the functions $f_j(x)$ are all polynomials, then $(\alpha_j - \alpha_i)$ divides the alternant determinant for all $1 \leq i < j \leq n$. In particular, if V is a Vandermonde matrix, then $\prod_{i < j} (\alpha_j - \alpha_i) = \det V$ divides such polynomial alternant determinants. The ratio $\det(M)/\det(V)$ is therefore a polynomial in $\alpha_1, \ldots, \alpha_m$ called the bialternant. The Schur polynomial $s_{(\lambda_1, \dots, \lambda_n)}$ is classically defined as the bialternant of the polynomials $f_j(x) = x^{\lambda_j}$.

== Applications ==
- Alternant matrices are used in coding theory in the construction of alternant codes.

== See also ==
- List of matrices
- Wronskian
