= Hadamard variation formula =

Formula in matrix theory

In matrix theory, the Hadamard variation formula is a set of differential equations for how the eigenvalues of a time-varying Hermitian matrix with distinct eigenvalues change with time.

== Statement ==
Consider the space of $n\times n$ Hermitian matrices with all eigenvalues distinct.

Let $A=A(t)$ be a path in the space. Let $u_i, \lambda_i$ be its eigenpairs.

Hadamard variation formula (Tao 2012, pp. 48–49)—If $A(t)$ is first-differentiable, then $\dot{\lambda}_i=u_i^* \dot{A} u_i$

If $A(t)$ is second-differentiable, then $\ddot \lambda_i=u_i^* \ddot{A} u_i+2 \sum_{j \neq i} \frac{\left|u_i^* \dot{A} u_j\right|^2}{\lambda_i-\lambda_j}$

Proof

Since $u_i^*u_i = 1$ does not change with time, taking the derivative, we find that $\langle \dot u_i, u_i\rangle$ is purely imaginary. Now, this is due to a unitary ambiguity in the choice of $u_i(t)$. Namely, for any first-differentiable $\theta(t)$, we can pick $v_i(t) := e^{i\theta(t)}u_i(t)$ instead. In that case, we have
$$\langle \dot v_i, v_i\rangle = \langle \dot u_i, u_i\rangle - i\dot\theta$$
so picking $\theta$ such that $\dot\theta = -i\langle \dot u_i, u_i\rangle$, we have $\langle \dot v_i, v_i\rangle = 0$. Thus, WLOG, we assume that $\langle \dot u_i, u_i\rangle = 0$.

Take derivative of $Au_i = \lambda_i u_i$,
$$\dot{A} u_i+A \dot{u}_i=\dot{\lambda}_i u_i+\lambda_i \dot{u}_i$$
Now take inner product with $u_i$.

Taking derivative of $\langle \dot u_i, u_i\rangle = 0$, we get
$$\langle \ddot u_i, u_i\rangle = \langle u_i, \ddot u_i\rangle = -\langle \dot u_i, \dot u_i\rangle$$
and all terms are real.

Take derivative of $\dot{A} u_i+A \dot{u}_i=\dot{\lambda}_i u_i+\lambda_i \dot{u}_i$, then multiply by $u_i^*$, and simplify by $u_i^* \dot{u}_i=0$, $u_i^* A=\lambda_i u_i^*$, we get
$$u_i^* \ddot{A} u_i+2 u_i^* \dot{A} \dot{u}_i=\ddot{\lambda}_i$$
- Expand $\dot{u}_i$ in the eigenbasis $\left\{u_j\right\}$ as $\dot{u}_i=\sum_{j \neq i} c_{i j} u_j$. Take derivative of $Au_i = \lambda_i u_i$, and multiply by $u_j^*A$, we obtain $c_{ij}=-\frac{u_j^* \dot{A} u_i}{\lambda_i-\lambda_j}$.

Higher order generalizations appeared in (Tao & Vu 2011).
