= Janet Ronsky =

Canadian biomechanical engineer

Janet Lenore Ronsky is a Canadian biomechanical engineer whose research concerns the mechanics and neurological control of the human musculoskeletal system, and the effects of age, gender, and disease on this system. She is a professor emerita at the University of Calgary, in its Department of Mechanical and Manufacturing Engineering and Department of Biomedical Engineering, a member of the university's McCaig Institute for Bone and Joint Health, and an affiliate faculty member in the Faculty of Kinesiology and Department of Surgery.

== Education and career ==
Ronsky majored in mechanical engineering at the University of Waterloo, graduating in 1983. She was a master's student at Calgary in 1989 when the École Polytechnique massacre of Canadian female engineering students happened; the incident hardened her resolve to stay in academia. She completed a Ph.D. in mechanical engineering at the University of Calgary in 1994. Her dissertation, In-vivo quantification of patellofemoral joint contact characteristics, was supervised by Benno Nigg.

She continued at the University of Calgary as a faculty member, and was promoted to full professor in 2003. She was awarded a Canada Research Chair in Biomedical Engineering in 2001, renewed in 2006, and subsequently held the Alberta Innovates iCORE Strategic Chair in Advanced Diagnostics and Devices. In 2003 she became the founding director of the Centre for Bioengineering Research and Education, and she subsequently served as executive director of the Biovantage Alberta Ingenuity Centre, established in 2009.

== Recognition ==
In 2004 Ronsky received the Award for the Support of Women in the Engineering Profession of the Canadian Council of Professional Engineers.

She is a Fellow of the Canadian Academy of Engineering, elected in 2009.
