= Vandermonde matrix =

Matrix of geometric progressions

In linear algebra, a Vandermonde matrix, named after Alexandre-Théophile Vandermonde, is a matrix with the terms of a geometric progression in each row: an $(m + 1) \times (n + 1)$ matrix

$$V = V(x_0, x_1, \cdots, x_m) =
\begin{pmatrix}
1 & x_0 & x_0^2 & \dots & x_0^n\\
1 & x_1 & x_1^2 & \dots & x_1^n\\
1 & x_2 & x_2^2 & \dots & x_2^n\\
\vdots & \vdots & \vdots & \ddots &\vdots \\
1 & x_m & x_m^2 & \dots & x_m^n
\end{pmatrix}$$

with entries $V_{i,j} = x_i^j$, the j^{th} power of the number $x_i$, for all zero-based indices $i$ and $j$. Some authors define the Vandermonde matrix as the transpose of the above matrix.

The determinant of a square Vandermonde matrix (when $n=m$) is called a Vandermonde determinant or Vandermonde polynomial. Its value is:

$$\det(V) = \prod_{0 \le i < j \le n} (x_j - x_i)
= (-1)^{n(n+1)/2} \prod_{0\le i < j\le n} (x_i-x_j).$$

This is non-zero if and only if all $x_i$ are distinct (no two are equal), making the Vandermonde matrix invertible.

== Applications ==
The polynomial interpolation problem is to find a polynomial $p(x) = a_0 + a_1 x + a_2 x^2 + \dots + a_n x^n$ which satisfies $p(x_0)=y_0, \ldots,p(x_m)=y_m$ for given data points $(x_0,y_0),\ldots,(x_m,y_m)$. This problem can be reformulated in terms of linear algebra by means of the Vandermonde matrix, as follows. $V$ computes the values of $p(x)$ at the points $x=x_0,\ x_1,\dots,\ x_m$ via a matrix multiplication $Va = y$, where $a = (a_0,\ldots,a_n)$ is the vector of coefficients and $y = (y_0,\ldots,y_m)= (p(x_0),\ldots,p(x_m))$ is the vector of values (both written as column vectors):

$$\begin{pmatrix}
1 & x_0 & x_0^2 & \dots & x_0^n\\
1 & x_1 & x_1^2 & \dots & x_1^n\\
1 & x_2 & x_2^2 & \dots & x_2^n\\
\vdots & \vdots & \vdots & \ddots &\vdots \\
1 & x_m & x_m^2 & \dots & x_m^n
\end{pmatrix}
\cdot
\begin{pmatrix}
a_0\\
a_1\\
\vdots\\
a_n
\end{pmatrix}
=
\begin{pmatrix}
p(x_0)\\
p(x_1)\\
\vdots\\
p(x_m)
\end{pmatrix}.$$
If $n = m$ and $x_0,\dots,\ x_n$ are distinct, then V is a square matrix with non-zero determinant, i.e. an invertible matrix. Thus, given V and y, one can find the required $p(x)$ by solving for its coefficients $a$ in the equation $Va = y$:

$a = V^{-1}y$.

That is, the map from coefficients to values of polynomials is a bijective linear mapping with matrix V, and the interpolation problem has a unique solution. This result is called the unisolvence theorem, and is a special case of the Chinese remainder theorem for polynomials.

In statistics, the equation $Va = y$ means that the Vandermonde matrix is the design matrix of polynomial regression.

In numerical analysis, solving the equation $Va = y$ naïvely by Gaussian elimination results in an algorithm with time complexity O(n^{3}). Exploiting the structure of the Vandermonde matrix, one can use Newton's divided differences method) to solve the equation in O(n^{2}) time, which also gives the UL factorization of $V^{-1}$. The resulting algorithm produces extremely accurate solutions, even if $V$ is ill-conditioned. (See polynomial interpolation.) Using displacement rank we obtain method requiring $\tilde O({\alpha ^{\omega - 1}}n)$ operations with the use of fast matrix multiplication algorithms, where $\alpha$ is just the rank and $\omega < 2.372$ is the matrix multiplication exponent.

The Vandermonde determinant is used in the representation theory of the symmetric group.

When the values $x_i$ belong to a finite field, the Vandermonde determinant is also called the Moore determinant, and has properties which are important in the theory of BCH codes and Reed–Solomon error correction codes.

The discrete Fourier transform is defined by a specific Vandermonde matrix, the DFT matrix, where the $x_i$ are chosen to be nth roots of unity. The Fast Fourier transform computes the product of this matrix with a vector in $O(n\log^2n)$ time. See the article on Multipoint Polynomial evaluation for details.

In the physical theory of the quantum Hall effect, the Vandermonde determinant shows that the Laughlin wavefunction with filling factor 1 is equal to a Slater determinant. This is no longer true for filling factors different from 1 in the fractional quantum Hall effect.

In the geometry of polyhedra, the Vandermonde matrix gives the normalized volume of arbitrary $k$-faces of cyclic polytopes. Specifically, if $F = C_d(t_{i_1}, \dots, t_{i_{k+1}})$ is a $k$-face of the cyclic polytope $C_d(T) \subset \mathbb{R}^{d}$ corresponding to $T = \{t_1< \cdots < t_N\} \subset \mathbb{R}$, then
$$\mathrm{nvol}(F) = \frac{1}{k!}\prod_{1 \leq m < n \leq k + 1}{(t_{i_n} - t_{i_m})}.$$

== Determinant ==
The determinant of a square Vandermonde matrix is called a Vandermonde polynomial or Vandermonde determinant. Its value is the polynomial

$$\det(V) = \prod_{0 \le i < j \le n} (x_j - x_i)$$

which is non-zero if and only if all $x_i$ are distinct.

The Vandermonde determinant was formerly sometimes called the discriminant, but in current terminology the discriminant of a polynomial $p(x)=(x-x_0)\cdots(x-x_n)$ is the square of the Vandermonde determinant of the roots $x_i$. The Vandermonde determinant is an alternating form in the $x_i$, meaning that exchanging two $x_i$ changes the sign, and $\det(V)$ thus depends on order for the $x_i$. By contrast, the discriminant $\det(V)^2$ does not depend on any order, so that Galois theory implies that the discriminant is a polynomial function of the coefficients of $p(x)$.

The determinant formula is proved below in three ways. The first uses polynomial properties, especially the unique factorization property of multivariate polynomials. Although conceptually simple, it involves non-elementary concepts of abstract algebra. The second proof is based on the linear algebra concepts of change of basis in a vector space and the determinant of a linear map. In the process, it computes the LU decomposition of the Vandermonde matrix. The third proof is more elementary but more complicated, using only elementary row and column operations.

=== First proof: Polynomial properties ===
The first proof relies on properties of polynomials.

By the Leibniz formula, $\det(V)$ is a polynomial in the $x_i$, with integer coefficients. All entries of the $(i+1)$-th column have total degree $i$. Thus, again by the Leibniz formula, all terms of the determinant have total degree

$$0 + 1 + 2 + \cdots + n = \frac{n(n+1)}2;$$

(that is, the determinant is a homogeneous polynomial of this degree).

If, for $i \neq j$, one substitutes $x_i$ for $x_j$, one gets a matrix with two equal rows, which has thus a zero determinant. Thus, considering the determinant as univariate in $x_i,$ the factor theorem implies that $x_j-x_i$ is a divisor of $\det(V).$ It thus follows that for all $i$ and $j$, $x_j-x_i$ is a divisor of $\det(V).$

This will now be strengthened to show that the product of all those divisors of $\det(V)$ is a divisor of $\det(V).$ Indeed, let $p$ be a polynomial with $x_i-x_j$ as a factor, then $p=(x_i-x_j)\,q,$ for some polynomial $q.$ If $x_k-x_l$ is another factor of $p,$ then $p$ becomes zero after the substitution of $x_k$ for $x_l.$ If $\{x_i,x_j\}\neq \{x_k, x_l\},$ the factor $q$ becomes zero after this substitution, since the factor $x_i-x_j$ remains nonzero. So, by the factor theorem, $x_k-x_l$ divides $q,$ and $(x_i-x_j)\,(x_k-x_l)$ divides $p.$

Iterating this process by starting from $\det(V),$ one gets that $\det(V)$ is divisible by the product of all $x_i-x_j$ with $i<j;$ that is

$$\det(V)=Q\prod_{0\le i<j\le n} (x_j-x_i),$$

where $Q$ is a polynomial. As the product of all $x_j-x_i$ and $\det(V)$ have the same degree $n(n + 1)/2$, the polynomial $Q$ is, in fact, a constant. This constant is one, because the product of the diagonal entries of $V$ is $x_1 x_2^2\cdots x_n^n$, which is also the monomial that is obtained by taking the first term of all factors in $\textstyle \prod_{0\le i<j\le n} (x_j-x_i).$ This proves that $Q=1,$ and finishes the proof.

$$\det(V)=\prod_{0\le i<j\le n} (x_j-x_i).$$

=== Second proof: linear maps ===
Let F be a field containing all $x_i,$ and $P_n$ the F vector space of the polynomials of degree at most n with coefficients in F. Let

$$\varphi:P_n\to F^{n+1}$$

be the linear map that maps every polynomial in $P_n$ to the $(n+1)$-tuple of its values at the $x_i,$ that is,

$$\varphi(p) \mapsto (p(x_0), p(x_1), \ldots, p(x_n))$$.

The Vandermonde matrix $V$ is the transformation matrix of $\varphi$ with respect to the canonical bases of $P_n$ and $F^{n+1}.$ Changing the basis of $P_n$ amounts to multiplying the Vandermonde matrix by a change-of-basis matrix $U$ (from the right). The polynomials

$\{\, 1, (x-x_0), (x-x_0)(x-x_1), \ldots , (x-x_0)(x-x_1) \cdots (x-x_{n-1}) \,\}$

are monic of respective degrees 0, 1, …, n and form a basis of $P_n$ whose change-of-basis matrix is an upper-triangular matrix $U$ with all diagonal entries equal to one, which thus has $\det(U)=1$. The transformation matrix of $\varphi$ on this new basis is thus:

$$L = VU = \begin{pmatrix}
1 & 0 & 0 & \ldots & 0 \\
1 & x_1-x_0 & 0 & \ldots & 0 \\
1 & x_2-x_0 & (x_2-x_0)(x_2-x_1) & \ldots & 0 \\
\vdots & \vdots & \vdots & \ddots & \vdots \\
1 & x_n-x_0 & (x_n-x_0)(x_n-x_1) & \ldots &
(x_n-x_0)(x_n-x_1)\cdots (x_n-x_{n-1})
\end{pmatrix}$$.

The determinant of this matrix is the product of its diagonal entries, so the Vandermonde determinant is:

$\det(V) = \det(LU^{-1})=\det(L)\det(U)^{-1} = \prod_{i<j} (x_j-x_i)\cdot 1$

This proves the desired equality, as well as giving the LU decomposition $V=LU^{-1}$.

=== Third proof: row and column operations ===
The third proof is based on the fact that if one adds to a column of a matrix the product by a scalar of another column then the determinant remains unchanged.

So, by subtracting to each column – except the first one – the preceding column multiplied by $x_0$, the determinant is not changed. (These subtractions must be done by starting from last columns, for subtracting a column that has not yet been changed). This gives the matrix

$$V = \begin{pmatrix}
1&0&0&0&\cdots&0\\
1&x_1-x_0&x_1(x_1-x_0)&x_1^2(x_1-x_0)&\cdots&x_1^{n-1}(x_1-x_0)\\
1&x_2-x_0&x_2(x_2-x_0)&x_2^2(x_2-x_0)&\cdots&x_2^{n-1}(x_2-x_0)\\
\vdots&\vdots&\vdots&\vdots&\ddots&\vdots\\
1&x_n-x_0&x_n(x_n-x_0)&x_n^2(x_n-x_0)&\cdots&x_n^{n-1}(x_n-x_0)\\
\end{pmatrix}$$

Applying the Laplace expansion formula along the first row, we obtain $\det(V)=\det(B)$, with

$$B = \begin{pmatrix}
x_1-x_0&x_1(x_1-x_0)&x_1^2(x_1-x_0)&\cdots&x_1^{n-1}(x_1-x_0)\\
x_2-x_0&x_2(x_2-x_0)&x_2^2(x_2-x_0)&\cdots&x_2^{n-1}(x_2-x_0)\\
\vdots&\vdots&\vdots&\ddots&\vdots\\
x_n-x_0&x_n(x_n-x_0)&x_n^2(x_n-x_0)&\cdots&x_n^{n-1}(x_n-x_0)\\
\end{pmatrix}$$

As all the entries in the $i$-th row of $B$ have a factor of $x_{i+1}-x_0$, one can take these factors out and obtain

$$\det(V)=(x_1-x_0)(x_2-x_0)\cdots(x_n-x_0)\begin{vmatrix}
1&x_1&x_1^2&\cdots&x_1^{n-1}\\
1&x_2&x_2^2&\cdots&x_2^{n-1}\\
\vdots&\vdots&\vdots&\ddots&\vdots\\
1&x_n&x_n^2&\cdots&x_n^{n-1}\\
\end{vmatrix}=\prod_{1<i\leq n}(x_i-x_0)\det(V')$$,

where $V'$ is a Vandermonde matrix in $x_1,\ldots, x_n$. Iterating this process on this smaller Vandermonde matrix, one eventually gets the desired expression of $\det(V)$ as the product of all $x_j-x_i$ such that $i<j$.

=== Rank of the Vandermonde matrix ===
- An m × n rectangular Vandermonde matrix such that m ≤ n has rank m if and only if all x_{i} are distinct.
- An m × n rectangular Vandermonde matrix such that m ≥ n has rank n if and only if there are n of the x_{i} that are distinct.
- A square Vandermonde matrix is invertible if and only if the x_{i} are distinct. An explicit formula for the inverse is known (see below).

== Generalizations ==
If the columns of the Vandermonde matrix, instead of $1, x, x^2, ...$, are general polynomials $p_0, p_1, ..., p_n$, such that each one has degree $0, 1, ..., n$, that is, if $V = [p_i(x_j)]_{i,j \in 0:n}$, then:
$$\det V(x_{0:n}) = \left(\prod_k c_k \right) \Delta(x),$$
where $c_0, ..., c_n$ are the head coefficients of $p_0, p_1, ..., p_n$, and $\Delta(x) = \prod_{0 \leq i < j \leq n} (x_j - x_i)$ is the Vandermonde determinant.

Proof

$\det V(x_{0:n})$ is zero whenever $x_j = x_k$, and has degree $\frac 12 n(n+1)$, so it is a multiple of $\prod_{i<j} (x_j - x_i)$. To find the constant in front, simply calculate the coefficient of the term $x_0^0 \dots x_n^n$, which is $c_0 \dots c_n$.

By multiplying with the Hermitian conjugate, we find that
$$\det \left[\sum_l p_j(z_l) p_k(z_l)^*\right] = \left(\prod_k |c_k|^2\right) |\Delta(z)|^2 = \det \left[\sum_l p_l(z_j) p_l(z_k)^*\right]$$

Theorem (Tao 2012, page 251)—Fix $x$, and at the $y \to 0$ limit,
$$\det [e^{x_i y_j}] = \frac{1}{1! \dots n!}\Delta(x) \Delta(y) + o(\Delta(y))$$
uniformly for $y$

Proof
Proof

If any $x_j = x_k$ or $y_j = y_k$, then the determinant is zero, so it has the form
$$\det [e^{x_i y_j}] = C(x,y) \Delta(x) \Delta(y)$$
where $C(x,y)$ is some power series in $x, y$.

The left side is a sum of the form
$$\sum_{\sigma} (-1)^{|\sigma|} e^{\sum_i x_i y_{\sigma(i)}}$$
Expand them by Taylor expansion. For fixed $x$, the series is uniformly convergent in $y$ in a neighborhood of zero.

To find the constant term of $C(x, y)$, simply calculate the coefficient of the term $x_0^0 y_0^0 \dots x_n^n y_n^n$, which is $\frac{1}{1! \cdots n!}$.

By the symmetry of the determinant, the next lowest-powered term of $C(x, y)$ is of form $a(x_0y_0 + \dots + x_n y_n)$, which is $o(1)$ as $y \to 0$.

== Inverse Vandermonde matrix ==
As explained above in Applications, the polynomial interpolation problem for $p(x) = a_0 + a_1 x + a_2 x^2 + \dots + a_n x^n$satisfying $p(x_0)=y_0, \ldots,p(x_n)=y_n$ is equivalent to the matrix equation $Va = y$, which has the unique solution $a = V^{-1}y$. There are other known formulas which solve the interpolation problem, which must be equivalent to the unique $a = V^{-1}y$, so they must give explicit formulas for the inverse matrix $V^{-1}$. In particular, Lagrange interpolation shows that the columns of the inverse matrix

$$V^{-1}=
\begin{pmatrix}
1 & x_0 & \dots & x_0^n \\
\vdots & \vdots & & \vdots \\[.5em]
1 & x_n & \dots & x_n^n
\end{pmatrix}^{-1}
= L =
\begin{pmatrix}
L_{00} & \!\!\!\!\cdots\!\!\!\! & L_{0n} \\
\vdots & & \vdots \\
L_{n0} & \!\!\!\!\cdots\!\!\!\! & L_{nn}
\end{pmatrix}$$

are the coefficients of the Lagrange polynomials

$L_j(x)=L_{0j}+L_{1j}x+\cdots+L_{nj}x^{n} = \prod_{0\leq i\leq n \atop i\neq j}\frac{x-x_i}{x_j-x_i} = \frac{f(x)}{(x-x_j)\,f'(x_j)}\,,$

where $f(x)=(x-x_0)\cdots(x-x_n)$. This is easily demonstrated: the polynomials clearly satisfy $L_j(x_i)=0$ for $i\neq j$ while $L_j(x_j)=1$, so we may compute the product $VL = [L_j(x_i)]_{i,j=0}^n = I$, the identity matrix.

== Confluent Vandermonde matrices ==
As described before, a Vandermonde matrix describes the linear algebra interpolation problem of finding the coefficients of a polynomial $p(x)$ of degree $n-1$ based on the values $p(x_1),\, ...,\, p(x_n)$, where $x_1,\, ...,\, x_n$ are distinct points. If $x_i$ are not distinct, then this problem does not have a unique solution (and the corresponding Vandermonde matrix is singular). However, if we specify the values of the derivatives at the repeated points, then the problem can have a unique solution. For example, the problem

$$\begin{cases}
p(0) = y_1 \\
p'(0) = y_2 \\
p(1) = y_3
\end{cases}$$

where $p(x) = ax^2+bx+c$, has a unique solution for all $y_1,y_2,y_3$ with $y_1\neq y_3$. In general, suppose that $x_1, x_2, ..., x_n$ are (not necessarily distinct) numbers, and suppose for simplicity that equal values are adjacent:

$$x_1 = \cdots = x_{m_1},\
x_{m_1+1} = \cdots = x_{m_2},\
\ldots,\
x_{m_{k-1}+1} = \cdots = x_{m_k}$$

where $m_1 < m_2 < \cdots < m_k=n,$ and $x_{m_1}, \ldots ,x_{m_k}$ are distinct. Then the corresponding interpolation problem is

$$\begin{cases}
p(x_{m_1}) = y_1, & p'(x_{m_1}) = y_2, & \ldots, & p^{(m_1-1)}(x_{m_1}) = y_{m_1}, \\
p(x_{m_2}) = y_{m_1+1}, & p'(x_{m_2})=y_{m_1+2}, & \ldots, & p^{(m_2-m_1-1)}(x_{m_2}) = y_{m_2}, \\
\qquad \vdots & & & \qquad\vdots \\
p(x_{m_k}) = y_{m_{k-1}+1}, & p'(x_{m_k}) = y_{m_{k-1}+2}, & \ldots, & p^{(m_k-m_{k-1}-1)}(x_{m_k}) = y_{m_k}.
\end{cases}$$

The corresponding matrix for this problem is called a confluent Vandermonde matrix, given as follows. If $1 \leq i,j \leq n$, then $m_\ell < i \leq m_{\ell + 1}$ for a unique $0 \leq \ell \leq k-1$ (denoting $m_0 = 0$). We let

$$V_{i,j} = \begin{cases}
0 & \text{if } j < i - m_\ell, \\[6pt]
\dfrac{(j-1)!}{(j - (i - m_\ell))!} x_i^{j-(i-m_\ell)} & \text{if } j \geq i - m_\ell.
\end{cases}$$

This generalization of the Vandermonde matrix makes it non-singular, so that there exists a unique solution to the system of equations, and it possesses most of the other properties of the Vandermonde matrix. Its rows are derivatives (of some order) of the original Vandermonde rows.

Another way to derive the above formula is by taking a limit of the Vandermonde matrix as the $x_i$'s approach each other. For example, to get the case of $x_1 = x_2$, take subtract the first row from second in the original Vandermonde matrix, and let $x_2\to x_1$: this yields the corresponding row in the confluent Vandermonde matrix. This derives the generalized interpolation problem with given values and derivatives as a limit of the original case with distinct points: giving $p(x_i), p'(x_i)$ is similar to giving $p(x_i), p(x_i + \varepsilon)$ for small $\varepsilon$. Geometers have studied the problem of tracking confluent points along their tangent lines, known as compactification of configuration space.

== See also ==
- Companion matrix § Diagonalizability
- Schur polynomial – a generalization
- Alternant matrix
- Lagrange polynomial
- Wronskian
- List of matrices
- Moore determinant over a finite field
- Vieta's formulas
