= Modular invariant theory =

Sub-field of mathematics

In mathematics, a modular invariant of a group is an invariant of a finite group acting on a vector space of positive characteristic (usually dividing the order of the group). The study of modular invariants was originated in about 1914 by Dickson (2004).

== Dickson invariant ==
When G is the finite general linear group GL_{n}(F_{q}) over the finite field F_{q} of order a prime power q acting on the ring F_{q}[X_{1}, ...,X_{n}] in the natural way, Dickson (1911) found a complete set of invariants as follows. Write [e_{1}, ..., e_{n}] for the determinant of the matrix whose entries are X^{q^{e_{j}}}_{i}, where e_{1}, ..., e_{n} are non-negative integers. For example, the Moore determinant [0,1,2] of order 3 is

$$\begin{vmatrix} x_1 & x_1^q & x_1^{q^2}\\x_2 & x_2^q & x_2^{q^2}\\x_3 & x_3^q & x_3^{q^2} \end{vmatrix}$$

Then under the action of an element g of GL_{n}(F_{q}) these determinants are all multiplied by det(g), so they are all invariants of SL_{n}(F_{q}) and the ratios [e_{1}, ...,e_{n}] / [0, 1, ..., n − 1] are invariants of GL_{n}(F_{q}), called Dickson invariants. Dickson proved that the full ring of invariants F_{q}[X_{1}, ...,X_{n}]^{GL_{n}(F_{q})} is a polynomial algebra over the n Dickson invariants [0, 1, ..., i − 1, i + 1, ..., n] / [0, 1, ..., n − 1] for i = 0, 1, ..., n − 1. Steinberg (1987) gave a shorter proof of Dickson's theorem.

The matrices [e_{1}, ..., e_{n}] are divisible by all non-zero linear forms in the variables X_{i} with coefficients in the finite field F_{q}. In particular the Moore determinant [0, 1, ..., n − 1] is a product of such linear forms, taken over 1 + q + q^{2} + ... + q^{n – 1} representatives of (n – 1)-dimensional projective space over the field. This factorization is similar to the factorization of the Vandermonde determinant into linear factors.

== See also ==
- Sanderson's theorem
