= Vandermonde polynomial =

Product of pairwise differences

In algebra, the Vandermonde polynomial of an ordered set of n variables $X_1,\dots, X_n$, named after Alexandre-Théophile Vandermonde, is the polynomial:

$$V_n = \prod_{1\le i<j\le n} (X_j-X_i).$$

Some sources use the opposite order, $(X_i-X_j)$, which changes the sign $\binom{n}{2}$ times and thus changes the overall sign of $V_n$ when n equals 2 or 3 modulo 4.

It is also called the Vandermonde determinant, as it is the value of the determinant of the Vandermonde matrix

$$\begin{bmatrix}
1 & X_1 & X_1^2 & \dots & X_1^{n-1}\\
1 & X_2 & X_2^2 & \dots & X_2^{n-1}\\
\vdots & \vdots & \vdots & \ddots &\vdots \\
1 & X_n & X_n^2 & \dots & X_n^{n-1}
\end{bmatrix}.$$

The value depends on the order of the terms: it is an alternating polynomial, not a symmetric polynomial.

== Alternating ==
A main property of the Vandermonde polynomial is that it is alternating in the entries, meaning that permuting the $X_i$ by an odd permutation changes the sign, while permuting them by an even permutation does not change the value of the polynomial – in fact, it is the basic alternating polynomial, as will be made precise below.

It thus depends on the order, and is zero if two entries are equal – this also follows from the formula, but is also consequence of being alternating: if two variables are equal, then switching them both does not change the value and inverts the value, yielding $V_n = -V_n,$ and thus $V_n = 0$ (assuming the characteristic is not 2, otherwise being alternating is equivalent to being symmetric).

Among all alternating polynomials, the Vandermonde polynomial is the lowest degree monic polynomial.

Conversely, the Vandermonde polynomial is a factor of every alternating polynomial: as shown above, an alternating polynomial vanishes if any two variables are equal, and thus must have $(X_i - X_j)$ as a factor for all $i \neq j$.

=== Alternating polynomials ===
Thus, the Vandermonde polynomial (together with the symmetric polynomials) generates the alternating polynomials.

== Derivatives ==
The first derivative is $\partial_{i} V_n= V_n \sum_{1 \leq j \leq n: j \neq i} \frac{1}{X_i - X_j}$.

Since it is the lowest degree monic alternating polynomial, and $\sum_i \partial_i^2 V_n$ is also alternating, this implies $\sum_i \partial_i^2 V_n = 0$. That is, $V_n$ is a harmonic function.

== Discriminant ==
Its square is widely called the discriminant, though some sources call the Vandermonde polynomial itself the discriminant.

The discriminant (the square of the Vandermonde polynomial: $\Delta_n=V_n^2$) does not depend on the order of terms, as $(-1)^2=1$, and is thus an invariant of the unordered set of points.

If one adjoins the Vandermonde polynomial to the ring of symmetric polynomials in n variables $\Lambda_n$, one obtains the quadratic extension $\Lambda_n[V_n]/\langle V_n^2-\Delta_n\rangle$, which is the ring of alternating polynomials.

== Vandermonde polynomial of a polynomial ==
Given a polynomial, the Vandermonde polynomial of its roots is defined over the splitting field; for a non-monic polynomial, with leading coefficient a, one may instead define the Vandermonde polynomial as

$$V_n = a^{n-1}\prod_{1\le i<j\le n} (X_j-X_i),$$

(multiplying with a leading term) to accord with the discriminant.

== Generalizations ==
Over arbitrary rings, one instead uses a different polynomial to generate the alternating polynomials – see (Romagny, 2005).

The Vandermonde determinant is a very special case of the Weyl denominator formula applied to the trivial representation of the special unitary group $\mathrm{SU}(n)$.

== See also ==
- Capelli polynomial (ref)
