= Expm =

Expm or expm may refer to:

- expm1, an abbreviation for the exponent minus 1 function in some Hewlett-Packard RPL scientific calculators
- Matrix exponential, the generalization of the exponential function to matrices.
