= Trigonometric functions of matrices =

Important functions in solving differential equations

The trigonometric functions (especially sine and cosine) for complex square matrices occur in solutions of second-order systems of differential equations. They are defined by the same Taylor series that hold for the trigonometric functions of complex numbers:

$$\begin{align}
\sin X & = X - \frac{X^3}{3!} + \frac{X^5}{5!} - \frac{X^7}{7!} + \cdots & = \sum_{n=0}^\infty \frac{(-1)^n}{(2n+1)!}X^{2n+1} \\
\cos X & = I - \frac{X^2}{2!} + \frac{X^4}{4!} - \frac{X^6}{6!} + \cdots & = \sum_{n=0}^\infty \frac{(-1)^n}{(2n)!}X^{2n}
\end{align}$$

with X^{n} being the nth power of the matrix X, and I being the identity matrix of appropriate dimensions.

Equivalently, they can be defined using the matrix exponential along with the matrix equivalent of Euler's formula, e^{iX} = cos X + i sin X, yielding

$$\begin{align}
\sin X & = {e^{iX} - e^{-iX} \over 2i} \\
\cos X & = {e^{iX} + e^{-iX} \over 2}.
\end{align}$$

For example, taking X to be a standard Pauli matrix,

$$\sigma_1 = \sigma_x =
\begin{pmatrix}
0&1\\
1&0
\end{pmatrix} ~,$$

one has

$$\sin(\theta \sigma_1) =     \sin(\theta)~ \sigma_1 , \qquad  \cos (\theta \sigma_1) =     \cos (\theta)~I~,$$

as well as, for the cardinal sine function,

$$\operatorname{sinc}( \theta \sigma_1) =\operatorname{sinc}( \theta) ~I.$$

== Properties ==
The analog of the Pythagorean trigonometric identity holds:

$$\sin^2 X + \cos^2 X = I$$

If X is a diagonal matrix, sin X and cos X are also diagonal matrices with (sin X)_{nn} = sin(X_{nn}) and (cos X)_{nn} = cos(X_{nn}), that is, they can be calculated by simply taking the sines or cosines of the matrices's diagonal components.

The analogs of the trigonometric addition formulas are true if and only if XY = YX:

$$\begin{align}
\sin (X \pm Y) = \sin X \cos Y \pm \cos X \sin Y \\
\cos (X \pm Y) = \cos X \cos Y \mp \sin X \sin Y
\end{align}$$

== Other functions ==
The tangent, as well as inverse trigonometric functions, hyperbolic and inverse hyperbolic functions have also been defined for matrices:

$\arcsin X = -i \ln \left( iX + \sqrt{I-X^2} \right)$ (see Inverse trigonometric functions#Logarithmic forms, Matrix logarithm, Square root of a matrix)
$$\begin{align}
\sinh X & = {e^X - e^{-X} \over 2} \\
\cosh X & = {e^X + e^{-X} \over 2}
\end{align}$$

and so on.
