= Derivative of the exponential map =

Formula in Lie group theory

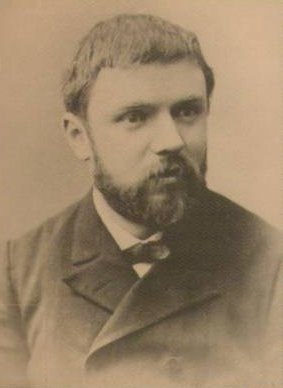
In 1899, Henri Poincaré's investigations into group multiplication in Lie algebraic terms led him to the formulation of the universal enveloping algebra.

In the theory of Lie groups, the exponential map is a map from the Lie algebra g of a Lie group G into G. In case G is a matrix Lie group, the exponential map reduces to the matrix exponential. The exponential map, denoted exp:g → G, is analytic and has as such a derivative d/dtexp(X(t)):Tg → TG, where X(t) is a C^{1} path in the Lie algebra, and a closely related differential dexp:Tg → TG.

The formula for dexp was first proved by Friedrich Schur (1891). It was later elaborated by Henri Poincaré (1899) in the context of the problem of expressing Lie group multiplication using Lie algebraic terms. It is also sometimes known as Duhamel's formula.

The formula is important both in pure and applied mathematics. It enters into proofs of theorems such as the Baker–Campbell–Hausdorff formula, and it is used frequently in physics for example in quantum field theory, as in the Magnus expansion in perturbation theory, and in lattice gauge theory.

Throughout, the notations exp(X) and e^{X} will be used interchangeably to denote the exponential given an argument, except when, where as noted, the notations have dedicated distinct meanings. The calculus-style notation is preferred here for better readability in equations. On the other hand, the exp-style is sometimes more convenient for inline equations, and is necessary on the rare occasions when there is a real distinction to be made.

== Statement ==
The derivative of the exponential map is given by

$\frac{d}{dt}e^{X(t)} = e^{X(t)}\frac{1 - e^{-\mathrm{ad}_{X}}}{\mathrm{ad}_{X}}\frac{dX(t)}{dt}.$ (1)

Explanation

- X = X(t) is a C^{1} (continuously differentiable) path in the Lie algebra with derivative X′(t) = dX(t)/dt. The argument t is omitted where not needed.
- ad_{X} is the linear transformation of the Lie algebra given by ad_{X}(Y) = [X, Y]. It is the adjoint action of a Lie algebra on itself.
- The fraction (1 − exp(−ad_{X}))/ad_{X} is given by the power series
  $\frac{1 - e^{-\mathrm{ad}_{X}}}{\mathrm{ad}_{X}} = \sum_{k = 0}^\infty \frac{(-1)^k}{(k + 1)!}(\mathrm{ad}_X)^k.$	2
  derived from the power series of the exponential map of a linear endomorphism, as in matrix exponentiation.
- When G is a matrix Lie group, all occurrences of the exponential are given by their power series expansion.
- When G is not a matrix Lie group, (1 − exp(−ad_{X}))/ad_{X} is still given by its power series (2), while the other two occurrences of exp in the formula, which now are the exponential map in Lie theory, refer to the time-one flow of the left invariant vector field X, i.e. element of the Lie algebra as defined in the general case, on the Lie group G viewed as an analytic manifold. This still amounts to exactly the same formula as in the matrix case. Left multiplication of an element of the algebra g by an element exp(X(t)) of the Lie group is interpreted as applying the differential of the left translation dL_{exp(X(t))}.
- The formula applies to the case where exp is considered as a map on matrix space over ℝ or C, see matrix exponential. When G = GL(n, C) or GL(n, R), the notions coincide precisely.

To compute the differential dexp of exp at X, dexp_{X}: Tg_{X} → TG_{exp(X)}, the standard recipe

$$d\exp_XY = \left .\frac{d}{dt}e^{Z(t)}\right|_{t = 0}, Z(0) = X, Z'(0) = Y$$

is employed. With Z(t) = X + tY the result

$d\exp_XY = e^{X}\frac{1 - e^{-\mathrm{ad}_{X}}}{\mathrm{ad}_{X}}Y$	3

follows immediately from (1). In particular, dexp_{0}:Tg_{0} → TG_{exp(0)} = TG_{e} is the identity because Tg_{X} ≃ g (since g is a vector space) and TG_{e} ≃ g.

== Proof ==
The proof given below assumes a matrix Lie group. This means that the exponential mapping from the Lie algebra to the matrix Lie group is given by the usual power series, i.e. matrix exponentiation. The conclusion of the proof still holds in the general case, provided each occurrence of exp is correctly interpreted. See comments on the general case below.

The outline of proof makes use of the technique of differentiation with respect to s of the parametrized expression

$$\Gamma(s, t) = e^{-sX(t)}\frac{\partial}{\partial t} e^{sX(t)}$$

to obtain a first order differential equation for Γ which can then be solved by direct integration in s. The solution is then e^{X} Γ(1, t).

Lemma

Let Ad denote the adjoint action of the group on its Lie algebra. The action is given by Ad_{A}X = AXA^{−1} for A ∈ G, X ∈ g. A frequently useful relationship between Ad and ad is given by (Note: A proof of the identity can be found in here. The relationship is simply that between a representation of a Lie group and that of its Lie algebra according to the Lie correspondence, since both Ad and ad are representations with ad = dAd.)

$\mathrm{Ad}_{e^X} = e^{\mathrm{ad}_X}, ~~X \in \mathfrak{g}~.$ (4)

Proof

Using the product rule twice one finds,

$$\frac{\partial\Gamma}{\partial s} = e^{-sX}(-X)\frac{\partial}{\partial t}e^{sX(t)} + e^{-sX}\frac{\partial}{\partial t}\left[X(t)e^{sX(t)}\right] = e^{-sX}\frac{dX}{dt}e^{sX}.$$

Then one observes that

$$\frac{\partial\Gamma}{\partial s} = \mathrm{Ad}_{e^{-sX}}X' = e^{-\mathrm{ad}_{sX}}X',$$

by (4) above. Integration yields

$$\Gamma(1, t) = e^{-X(t)}\frac{\partial}{\partial t}e^{X(t)} = \int_0^1 \frac{\partial\Gamma}{\partial s}ds = \int_0^1 e^{-\mathrm{ad}_{sX}}X'ds.$$

Using the formal power series to expand the exponential, integrating term by term, and finally recognizing (2),

$$\Gamma(1, t) = \int_0^1 \sum_{k = 0}^\infty \frac{(-1)^ks^k}{k!} (\mathrm{ad}_X)^k\frac{dX}{dt}ds = \sum_{k = 0}^\infty \frac{(-1)^k}{(k + 1)!}(\mathrm{ad}_X)^k \frac{dX}{dt} = \frac{1-e^{-\mathrm{ad}_X}}{\mathrm{ad}_X}\frac{dX}{dt},$$

and the result follows. The proof, as presented here, is essentially the one given in Rossmann (2002). A proof with a more algebraic touch can be found in Hall (2015).

=== Comments on the general case ===
The formula in the general case is given by

$$\frac{d}{dt}\exp(C(t)) = \exp(C)\phi(-\mathrm{ad}(C))C~ ',$$

where (Note: It holds that $$\tau(\log z)\phi(-\log z) = 1$$ for |z − 1| < 1 where $$\tau(w) = \frac{w}{1 - e^{-w}}.$$ Here, τ is the exponential generating function of $$(-1)^k b_k,$$ where b_{k} are the Bernoulli numbers.)

$$\phi(z) = \frac{e^z - 1}{z} = 1 + \frac{1}{2!}z + \frac{1}{3!}z^2 + \cdots,$$

which formally reduces to

$$\frac{d}{dt}\exp(C(t)) = \exp(C)\frac{1 - e^{-\mathrm{ad}_{C}}}{\mathrm{ad}_{C}}\frac{dC(t)}{dt}.$$

Here the exp-notation is used for the exponential mapping of the Lie algebra and the calculus-style notation in the fraction indicates the usual formal series expansion. For more information and two full proofs in the general case, see the freely available Sternberg (2004) reference.

=== A direct formal argument ===
An immediate way to see what the answer must be, provided it exists is the following. Existence needs to be proved separately in each case. By direct differentiation of the standard limit definition of the exponential, and exchanging the order of differentiation and limit,

$$\begin{align}
\frac{d}{dt}e^{X(t)}
&= \lim_{N \to \infty}\frac{d}{dt}\left(1 + \frac{X(t)}{N}\right)^N\\
&= \lim_{N \to \infty}\sum_{k=1}^N\left(1 + \frac{X(t)}{N}\right)^{N-k}\frac{1}{N}\frac{dX(t)}{dt}\left(1 + \frac{X(t)}{N}\right)^{k-1}~,
\end{align}$$

where each factor owes its place to the non-commutativity of X(t) and X´(t).

Dividing the unit interval into N sections Δs = Δk/N (Δk = 1 since the sum indices are integers) and letting N → ∞, Δk → dk, k/N → s, Σ → ∫ yields

$$\begin{align}
\frac{d}{dt}e^{X(t)} &= \int_{0}^1e^{(1-s)X}X'e^{sX}ds = e^X \int_{0}^1 \mathrm{Ad}_{e^{-sX}} X' ds \\
&= e^X \int_{0}^1 e^{-\mathrm{ad}_{sX}} dsX' = e^X \frac{1-e^{-\mathrm{ad}_X}}{\mathrm{ad}_X}\frac{dX}{dt}~.
\end{align}$$

== Applications ==
=== Local behavior of the exponential map ===
The inverse function theorem together with the derivative of the exponential map provides information about the local behavior of exp. Any C^{k}, 0 ≤ k ≤ ∞, ω map f between vector spaces (here first considering matrix Lie groups) has a C^{k} inverse such that f is a C^{k} bijection in an open set around a point x in the domain provided df_{x} is invertible. From (3) it follows that this will happen precisely when

$$\frac{1 - e^{\mathrm{ad_X}}}{\mathrm{ad}_X}$$

is invertible. This, in turn, happens when the eigenvalues of this operator are all nonzero. The eigenvalues of (1 − exp(−ad_{X}))/ad_{X} are related to those of ad_{X} as follows. If g is an analytic function of a complex variable expressed in a power series such that g(U) for a matrix U converges, then the eigenvalues of g(U) will be g(λ_{ij}), where λ_{ij} are the eigenvalues of U, the double subscript is made clear below. (Note: This is seen by choosing a basis for the underlying vector space such that U is triangular, the eigenvalues being the diagonal elements. Then U^{k} is triangular with diagonal elements λ_{i}^{k}. It follows that the eigenvalues of U are f(λ_{i}). See Rossmann 2002, Lemma 6 in section 1.2.) In the present case with g(U) = (1 − exp(−U))/U and U = ad_{X}, the eigenvalues of (1 − exp(−ad_{X}))/ad_{X} are

$$\frac{1 - e^{-\lambda_{ij}}}{\lambda_{ij}},$$

where the λ_{ij} are the eigenvalues of ad_{X}. Putting (1 − exp(−λ_{ij}))/λ_{ij} = 0 one sees that dexp is invertible precisely when

$$\lambda_{ij} \ne k2\pi i, k = \pm1, \pm2, \ldots.$$

The eigenvalues of ad_{X} are, in turn, related to those of X. Let the eigenvalues of X be λ_{i}. Fix an ordered basis e_{i} of the underlying vector space V such that X is lower triangular. Then

$$Xe_i = \lambda_ie_i + \cdots,$$

with the remaining terms multiples of e_{n} with n > i. Let E_{ij} be the corresponding basis for matrix space, i.e. (E_{ij})_{kl} = δ_{ik}δ_{jl}. Order this basis such that E_{ij} < E_{nm} if i − j < n − m. One checks that the action of ad_{X} is given by

$$\mathrm{ad}_XE_{ij} = (\lambda_i - \lambda_j)E_{ij} + \cdots \equiv \lambda_{ij}E_{ij} + \cdots,$$

with the remaining terms multiples of E_{mn} > E_{ij}. This means that ad_{X} is lower triangular with its eigenvalues λ_{ij} = λ_{i} − λ_{j} on the diagonal. The conclusion is that dexp_{X} is invertible, hence exp is a local bianalytical bijection around X, when the eigenvalues of X satisfy (Note: Matrices whose eigenvalues λ satisfy |Im λ| < π are, under the exponential, in bijection with matrices whose eigenvalues μ are not on the negative real line or zero. The λ and μ are related by the complex exponential. See Rossmann (2002) Remark 2c section 1.2.)

$$\lambda_i - \lambda_j \ne k2\pi i, \quad k = \pm1, \pm2, \ldots, \quad 1 \le i, j \le n = \dim V.$$

In particular, in the case of matrix Lie groups, it follows, since dexp_{0} is invertible, by the inverse function theorem that exp is a bi-analytic bijection in a neighborhood of 0 ∈ g in matrix space. Furthermore, exp, is a bi-analytic bijection from a neighborhood of 0 ∈ g in g to a neighborhood of e ∈ G. The same conclusion holds for general Lie groups using the manifold version of the inverse function theorem.

It also follows from the implicit function theorem that dexp_{ξ} itself is invertible for ξ sufficiently small.

=== Derivation of a Baker–Campbell–Hausdorff formula ===
If Z(t) is defined such that

$$e^{Z(t)} = e^{X} e^{tY},$$

an expression for Z(1) = log( exp X exp Y ), the Baker–Campbell–Hausdorff formula, can be derived from the above formula,

$$\exp(-Z(t))\frac{d}{dt}\exp(Z(t)) = \frac{1 - e^{-\mathrm{ad}_{Z}}}{\mathrm{ad}_{Z}}Z'(t).$$

Its left-hand side is easy to see to equal Y. Thus,

$$Y = \frac{1 - e^{-\mathrm{ad}_{Z}}}{\mathrm{ad}_{Z}}Z'(t),$$

and hence, formally,

$$Z'(t) = \frac{\mathrm{ad}_{Z}}{1 - e^{-\mathrm{ad}_{Z}}} Y \equiv \psi\left(e^{\mathrm{ad}_{Z}}\right)Y, \quad
\psi(w) = \frac{w\log w}{w - 1} = 1 + \sum_{m=1}^\infty \frac{(-1)^{m + 1}}{m(m + 1)}(w - 1)^m, \|w\| < 1.$$

However, using the relationship between Ad and ad given by (4), it is straightforward to further see that

$$e^{\mathrm{ad}_{Z}} = e^{\mathrm{ad}_{X}} e^{t\mathrm{ad}_{Y}}$$

and hence

$$Z'(t) = \psi\left(e^{\mathrm{ad}_{X}} e^{t\mathrm{ad}_{Y}}\right)Y.$$

Putting this into the form of an integral in t from 0 to 1 yields,

$$Z(1) = \log(\exp X\exp Y) = X + \left( \int^1_0 \psi \left(e^{\operatorname{ad}_X} ~ e^{t \,\text{ad}_Y}\right) \, dt \right) \, Y,$$

an integral formula for Z(1) that is more tractable in practice than the explicit Dynkin's series formula due to the simplicity of the series expansion of ψ. Note this expression consists of X+Y and nested commutators thereof with X or Y. A textbook proof along these lines can be found in Hall (2015) and Miller (1972).

=== Derivation of Dynkin's series formula ===
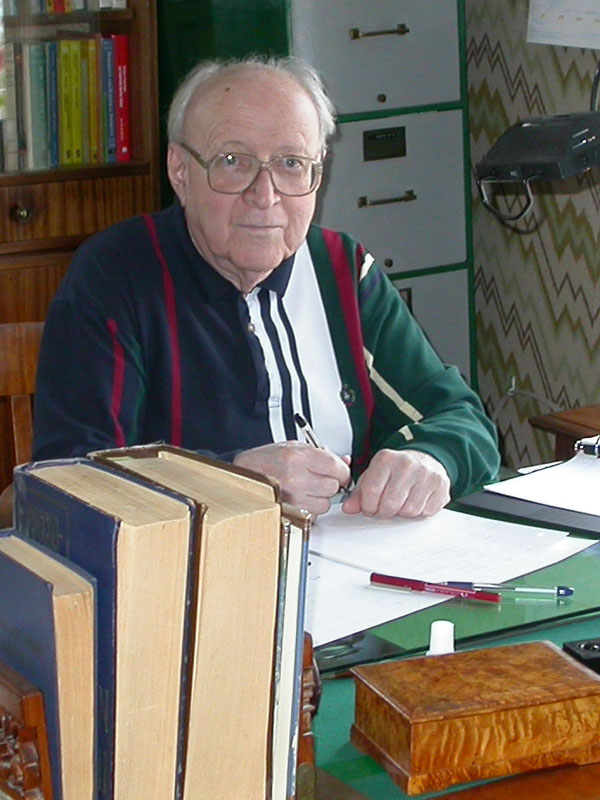
Eugene Dynkin at home in 2003. In 1947 Dynkin proved the explicit BCH series formula. Poincaré, Baker, Campbell and Hausdorff were mostly concerned with the existence of a bracket series, which suffices in many applications, for instance, in proving central results in the Lie correspondence.

Dynkin's formula mentioned may also be derived analogously, starting from the parametric extension

$$e^{Z(t)} = e^{tX} e^{tY},$$

whence

$$e^{-Z(t)} \frac{de^{Z(t)}}{dt} = e^{-t \, \mathrm{ad}_{Y}}X + Y ~,$$

so that, using the above general formula,

$$Z' = \frac{\mathrm{ad}_{Z}}{1 - e^{-\mathrm{ad}_{Z}}} ~ \left(e^{-t \, \mathrm{ad}_{Y}}X + Y\right) = \frac{\mathrm{ad}_{Z}}{e^{\mathrm{ad}_{Z}} - 1} ~ \left(X + e^{t \, \mathrm{ad}_{X}}Y\right) .$$

Since, however,

$$\begin{align}
\mathrm{ad_Z}
&= \log\left(\exp\left(\mathrm{ad}_Z\right)\right) = \log\left(1 + \left(\exp\left(\mathrm{ad}_Z\right) - 1\right)\right) \\
&= \sum\limits^{\infty}_{n=1} \frac{(-1)^{n+1}}{n} (\exp(\mathrm{ad}_Z) - 1)^n ~, \quad \|\mathrm{ad}_Z\| < \log 2   ~~,
\end{align}$$

the last step by virtue of the Mercator series expansion, it follows that

$Z' = \sum\limits^{\infty}_{n=1} \frac{(-1)^{n-1}}{n} \left(e^{\mathrm{ad}_Z} - 1\right)^{n-1} ~ \left(X + e^{t \, \mathrm{ad}_{X}}Y\right)~,$	5

and, thus, integrating,

$$Z(1) = \int^1 _0 dt ~\frac{dZ(t)}{dt} = \sum^{\infty}_{n=1} \frac{(-1)^{n-1}}{n} \int^1 _0 dt ~\left(e^{t \, \mathrm{ad}_{X}} e^{t\mathrm{ad}_{Y}} - 1\right)^{n-1} ~ \left(X + e^{t \, \mathrm{ad}_{X}}Y\right) .$$

It is at this point evident that the qualitative statement of the BCH formula holds, namely Z lies in the Lie algebra generated by X, Y and is expressible as a series in repeated brackets (A). For each k, terms for each partition thereof are organized inside the integral ∫dt t^{k−1}. The resulting Dynkin's formula is then

$Z = \sum_{k = 1}^\infty \frac{(-1)^{k-1}}{k} \sum_{s \in S_{k}} \frac{1}{i_1 + j_1 + \cdots + i_k + j_k}\frac{[X^{(i_1)}Y^{(j_1)}\cdots X^{(i_k)}Y^{(j_k)}]}{i_1!j_1!\cdots i_k!j_k!}, \quad i_r,j_r \ge 0,\quad i_r + j_r > 0,\quad 1 \le r \le k.$

For a similar proof with detailed series expansions, see Rossmann (2002).

=== Combinatoric details ===
Change the summation index in (5) to k = n − 1 and expand

$\frac{dZ}{dt} = \sum_{k = 0}^\infty \frac{(-1)^{k}}{k + 1}\left\{\left(e^{\mathrm{ad}_{tX}}e^{\mathrm{ad}_{tY}} - 1\right)^kX + \left(e^{\mathrm{ad}_{tX}}e^{\mathrm{ad}_{tY}} - 1\right)^ke^{\mathrm{ad}_{tX}}Y\right\}$	97

in a power series. To handle the series expansions simply, consider first Z = log(e^{X}e^{Y}). The log-series and the exp-series are given by

$$\log(A) = \sum_{k = 1}^\infty \frac{(-1)^{k + 1}}{k}{(A - I)}^k,\quad \text{and}\quad e^X = \sum_{k = 0}^\infty \frac{X^k}{k!}$$

respectively. Combining these one obtains

$\log\left(e^X e^Y\right) = \sum_{k = 1}^\infty \frac{(-1)^{k + 1}}{k}{\left(e^Xe^Y - I\right)}^k = \sum_{k = 1}^\infty \frac{(-1)^{k + 1}}{k}\left({\sum_{i = 0}^\infty \frac{X^i}{i!}\sum_{j = 0}^\infty \frac{Y^j}{j!} - I}\right)^k = \sum_{k = 1}^\infty \frac{(-1)^{k + 1}}{k} \left(\sum_{i,j \ge 0, i + j > 1}^\infty \frac{X^iY^j}{i!j!} \right)^k.$	98

This becomes

$Z = \log\left(e^X e^Y\right) = \sum_{k = 1}^\infty \frac{(-1)^{k + 1}}{k} \sum_{s \in S_k} \frac{X^{i_1}Y^{j_1}\cdots X^{i_k}Y^{j_k}}{i_1!j_1!\cdots i_k!j_k!}, \quad i_r, j_r \ge 0, \quad i_r + j_r > 0, \quad 1 \le r \le k,$ (99)

where S_{k} is the set of all sequences s = (i_{1}, j_{1}, ..., i_{k}, j_{k}) of length 2k subject to the conditions in (99).

Now substitute (e^{X}e^{Y} − 1) for (e^{ad_{tX}}e^{ad_{tY}} − 1) in the LHS of (98). Equation (99) then gives

$$\begin{align}
\frac{dZ}{dt} = \sum_{k = 0}^\infty \frac{(-1)^{k}}{k + 1} \sum_{s \in S_k, i_{k+1} \ge 0} &t^{i_1 + j_1 + \cdots + i_k + j_k}\frac{{\mathrm{ad}_{X}}^{i_1}{\mathrm{ad}_{Y}}^{j_1}\cdots {\mathrm{ad}_{X}}^{i_k}{\mathrm{ad}_{Y}}^{j_k}}{i_1!j_1!\cdots i_k!j_k!}X \\
{}+{} &t^{i_1 + j_1 + \cdots + i_k + j_k + i_{k + 1}}\frac{{\mathrm{ad}_{X}}^{i_1}{\mathrm{ad}_{Y}}^{j_1}\cdots {\mathrm{ad}_{X}}^{i_k}{\mathrm{ad}_{Y}}^{j_k}X^{i_{k+1}}}{i_1!j_1!\cdots i_k!j_k!i_{k+1}!}Y, \quad i_r,j_r \ge 0, \quad i_r + j_r > 0,\quad 1 \le r \le k,
\end{align}$$

or, with a switch of notation, see An explicit Baker–Campbell–Hausdorff formula,

$$\begin{align}
\frac{dZ}{dt} = \sum_{k = 0}^\infty \frac{(-1)^{k}}{k + 1} \sum_{s \in S_k, i_{k+1} \ge 0}
&t^{i_1 + j_1 + \cdots + i_k + j_k}\frac{\left[X^{(i_1)}Y^{(j_1)}\cdots X^{(i_k)}Y^{(j_k)}X\right]}{i_1!j_1!\cdots i_k!j_k!}\\
{}+{} &t^{i_1 + j_1 + \cdots + i_k + j_k + i_{k+1}}\frac{\left[X^{(i_1)}Y^{(j_1)}\cdots X^{(i_k)}Y^{(j_k)}X^{(i_{k+1})}Y\right]}{i_1!j_1!\cdots i_k!j_k!i_{k+1}!}, \quad i_r,j_r \ge 0, \quad i_r + j_r > 0, \quad 1 \le r \le k
\end{align}.$$

Note that the summation index for the rightmost e^{ad_{tX}} in the second term in (97) is denoted i_{k + 1}, but is not an element of a sequence s ∈ S_{k}. Now integrate Z = Z(1) = ∫dZ/dtdt, using Z(0) = 0,

$$\begin{align}
Z = \sum_{k = 0}^\infty \frac{(-1)^{k}}{k + 1} \sum_{s \in S_k, i_{k+1} \ge 0} &\frac{1}{i_1 + j_1 + \cdots + i_k + j_k + 1}\frac{\left[X^{(i_1)}Y^{(j_1)}\cdots X^{(i_k)}Y^{(j_k)}X\right]}{i_1!j_1!\cdots i_k!j_k!}\\
{}+{} &\frac{1}{i_1 + j_1 + \cdots + i_k + j_k + i_{k+1} + 1}\frac{\left[X^{(i_1)}Y^{(j_1)}\cdots X^{(i_k)}Y^{(j_k)}X^{(i_{k+1})}Y\right]}{i_1!j_1!\cdots i_k!j_k!i_{k+1}!}, \quad i_r,j_r \ge 0,\quad i_r + j_r > 0,\quad 1 \le r \le k
\end{align}.$$

Write this as

$$\begin{align}
Z = \sum_{k = 0}^\infty \frac{(-1)^{k}}{k + 1} \sum_{s \in S_k, i_{k+1} \ge 0}
&\frac{1}{i_1 + j_1 + \cdots + i_k + j_k + (i_{k + 1} = 1) + (j_{k+1} = 0)}\frac{\left[X^{(i_1)}Y^{(j_1)}\cdots X^{(i_k)}Y^{(j_k)}X^{(i_{k + 1} = 1)}Y^{(j_{k+1} = 0)}\right]}{i_1!j_1!\cdots i_k!j_k!(i_{k+1} = 1)!(j_{k+1} = 0)!}\\
{}+{} &\frac{1}{i_1 + j_1 + \cdots + i_k + j_k + i_{k+1} + (j_{k+1} = 1)}\frac{\left[X^{(i_1)}Y^{(j_1)}\cdots X^{(i_k)}Y^{(j_k)}X^{(i_{k+1})}Y^{(j_{k+1} = 1)}\right]}{i_1!j_1!\cdots i_k!j_k!i_{k+1}!(j_{k+1} = 1)!}, \\\\
& (i_r,j_r \ge 0,\quad i_r + j_r > 0,\quad 1 \le r \le k).
\end{align}$$

This amounts to

$Z = \sum_{k = 0}^\infty \frac{(-1)^{k} }{k + 1} \sum_{s \in S_{k+1} } \frac{1}{i_1 + j_1 + \cdots + i_k + j_k + i_{k + 1} + j_{k+1} }\frac{\left[X^{(i_1)}Y^{(j_1)}\cdots X^{(i_k)}Y^{(j_k)}X^{(i_{k + 1})}Y^{(j_{k+1})}\right]}{i_1!j_1!\cdots i_k!j_k!i_{k+1}!j_{k+1}!},$	100

where $i_r,j_r \ge 0,\quad i_r + j_r > 0,\quad 1 \le r \le k + 1,$ using the simple observation that [T, T] = 0 for all T. That is, in (100), the leading term vanishes unless j_{k + 1} equals 0 or 1, corresponding to the first and second terms in the equation before it. In case j_{k + 1} = 0, i_{k + 1} must equal 1, else the term vanishes for the same reason (i_{k + 1} = 0 is not allowed). Finally, shift the index, k → k − 1,

$Z = \log e^Xe^Y = \sum_{k = 1}^\infty \frac{(-1)^{k-1}}{k} \sum_{s \in S_{k}} \frac{1}{i_1 + j_1 + \cdots + i_k + j_k}\frac{\left[X^{(i_1)}Y^{(j_1)}\cdots X^{(i_k)}Y^{(j_k)}\right]}{i_1!j_1!\cdots i_k!j_k!},~ i_r,j_r \ge 0,~ i_r + j_r > 0,~ 1 \le r \le k.$

This is Dynkin's formula. The striking similarity with (99) is not accidental: It reflects the Dynkin–Specht–Wever map, underpinning the original, different, derivation of the formula. Namely, if

$$X^{i_1}Y^{j_1} \cdots X^{i_k}Y^{j_k}$$

is expressible as a bracket series, then necessarily

$X^{i_1}Y^{j_1} \cdots X^{i_k}Y^{j_k} = \frac{\left[X^{(i_1)}Y^{(j_1)}\cdots X^{(i_k)}Y^{(j_k)}\right]}{i_1 + j_1 + \cdots + i_k + j_k}.$	B

Putting observation (A) and theorem (B) together yields a concise proof of the explicit BCH formula.

== See also ==
- Matrix logarithm
