= Friedrich Schur =

German mathematician

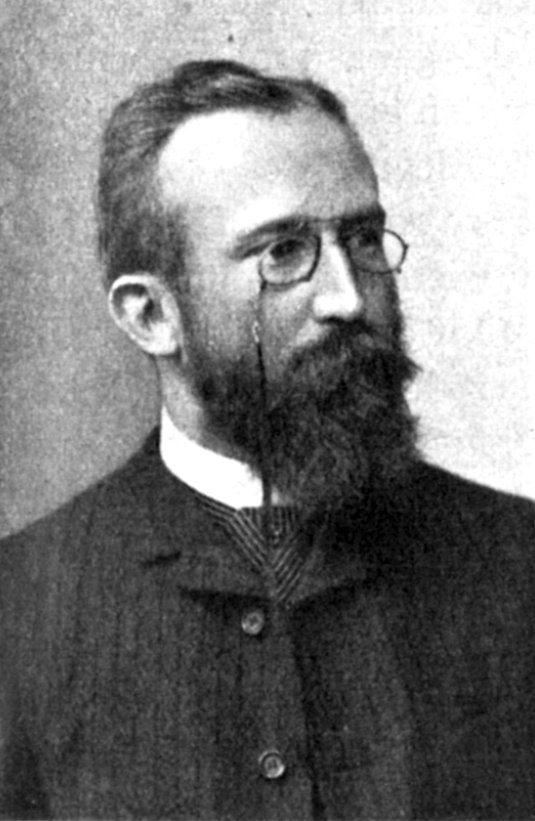
Friedrich Schur

Friedrich Heinrich Schur (27 January 1856, Maciejewo, Krotoschin, Province of Posen – 18 March 1932, Breslau) was a German mathematician who studied geometry.

== Life and work ==
Schur's family was originally Jewish, but converted to Protestantism. His father owned an estate. He attended high school in Krotoschin and in 1875 studied at University of Wroclaw astronomy and mathematics under Heinrich Schröter and Jacob Rosanes. He then went to the Berlin University, where he studied under Karl Weierstrass, Ernst Eduard Kummer, Leopold Kronecker and Gustav Kirchhoff and received his doctorate in 1879 from Kummer: Geometrische Untersuchungen über Strahlenkomplexe ersten und zweiten Grades. In 1880, he passed the exam and the same year qualified as a teacher at the University of Leipzig. After that, he was an assistant professor and in 1884 became an assistant to Felix Klein in Leipzig. In 1885 he was an associate professor there in 1888 and professor at the University of Tartu. In 1892, he was a professor of descriptive geometry at the RWTH Aachen University and in 1897 was a professor at the University of Karlsruhe, where he was also rector in 1904/1905. In 1909, he became a professor at the University of Strasbourg. After the loss of World War I, he was sacked by the French in 1919 and became a professor in Breslau, where he retired in 1924.

Friedrich Schur studied differential geometry, transformation groups (Lie groups) after Sophus Lie. Many of his results, which he summarized in his book Grundlagen der Geometrie (Foundation of Geometry) of 1909, can also be found in the work of David Hilbert without reference to Schur. He also wrote a textbook of analytical geometry (1898) and the graphical statics (1915).

In 1912, he received the Lobachevsky Prize for his book Grundlagen der Geometrie, a Russian prize. In 1910, he was chairman of the German Mathematical Society. He holds honorary doctorates from the University of Karlsruhe. In 1927, he was selected as a corresponding member of the Bavarian Academy of Sciences.

Among his students was Theodor Molien and Julius Wellstein.

== Writings (selection) ==
- Schur: Grundlagen der Geometrie. Teubner, Leipzig 1909.
- Schur: Lehrbuch der analytischen Geometrie.
- Schur: Zur Theorie der endlichen Transformationsgruppen. Mathematische Annalen, Bd.38, 1891.
- Schur: Ueber den Fundamentalsatz der projectiven Geometrie. Mathematische Annalen, Bd.51, 1899.
- Schur: Ueber die Grundlagen der Geometrie. Mathematische Annalen, Bd. 55, 1902

== See also ==
- Baker–Campbell–Hausdorff formula
- Derivative of the exponential map
- K3 surface
