= Lie product formula =

Formula of matrix exponentials

In mathematics, the Lie product formula, named for Sophus Lie (1875), but also widely called the Trotter product formula, named after Hale Trotter, states that for arbitrary m × m real or complex matrices A and B,
$$e^{A+B} = \lim_{n \rightarrow \infty} (e^{A/n}e^{B/n})^n,$$
where e^{A} denotes the matrix exponential of A. The Lie–Trotter product formula and the Trotter–Kato theorem extend this to certain unbounded linear operators A and B.

This formula is an analogue of the classical exponential law
$$e^{x+y} = e^x e^y$$

which holds for all real or complex numbers x and y. If x and y are replaced with matrices A and B, and the exponential replaced with a matrix exponential, it is usually necessary for A and B to commute for the law to still hold. However, the Lie product formula holds for all matrices A and B, even ones which do not commute.

The Lie product formula is conceptually related to the Baker–Campbell–Hausdorff formula, in that both are replacements, in the context of noncommuting operators, for the classical exponential law.

The formula has applications, for example, in the path integral formulation of quantum mechanics. It allows one to separate the Schrödinger evolution operator (propagator) into alternating increments of kinetic and potential operators (the Suzuki–Trotter decomposition, after Trotter and Masuo Suzuki). The same idea is used in the construction of splitting methods for the numerical solution of differential equations. Moreover, the Lie product theorem is sufficient to prove the Feynman–Kac formula.

The Trotter–Kato theorem can be used for approximation of linear C_{0}-semigroups.

== Proof ==
By the Baker–Campbell–Hausdorff formula, $(e^{A/n}e^{B/n})^n = e^{A + B + \frac{1}{2n} [A,B] + \cdots} \to e^{A+B}$ as $n \to +\infty$.

== See also ==
- Time-evolving block decimation
