= List of named matrices =

Several important classes of matrices are subsets of each other.

This article lists some important classes of matrices used in mathematics, science and engineering. A matrix (plural matrices, or less commonly matrixes) is a rectangular array of numbers called entries. Matrices have a long history of both study and application, leading to diverse ways of classifying matrices. A first group is matrices satisfying concrete conditions of the entries, including constant matrices. Important examples include the identity matrix given by

$$I_n = \begin{bmatrix}
1 & 0 & \cdots & 0 \\
0 & 1 & \cdots & 0 \\
\vdots & \vdots & \ddots & \vdots \\
0 & 0 & \cdots & 1 \end{bmatrix}.$$

and the zero matrix of dimension $m \times n$. For example:

$$O_{2 \times 3} = \begin{pmatrix} 0 & 0 & 0 \\ 0 & 0 & 0  \end{pmatrix}$$.

Further ways of classifying matrices are according to their eigenvalues, or by imposing conditions on the product of the matrix with other matrices. Finally, many domains, both in mathematics and other sciences including physics and chemistry, have particular matrices that are applied chiefly in these areas.

== Constant matrices ==
The list below comprises matrices whose elements are constant for any given dimension (size) of matrix. The matrix entries will be denoted a_{ij}. The table below uses the Kronecker delta δ_{ij} for two integers i and j which is 1 if i = j and 0 else.

Name	Explanation	Symbolic description of the entries	Notes
Commutation matrix	The matrix of the linear map that maps a matrix to its transpose		See Vectorization
Duplication matrix	The matrix of the linear map mapping the vector of the distinct entries of a symmetric matrix to the vector of all entries of the matrix		See Vectorization
Elimination matrix	The matrix of the linear map mapping the vector of the entries of a matrix to the vector of a part of the entries (for example the vector of the entries that are not below the main diagonal)		See vectorization
Exchange matrix	The binary matrix with ones on the anti-diagonal, and zeroes everywhere else.	a_{ij} = δ_{n+1−i,j}	A permutation matrix.
Hilbert matrix	A structured grid of rational values formed by the sum of polynomial denominators, modulated symmetrically and positively as approximation behavior	a_{ij} = (i + j − 1)^{−1}.	A Hankel matrix.
Identity matrix	A square diagonal matrix, with all entries on the main diagonal equal to 1, and the rest 0.	a_{ij} = δ_{ij}	
Lehmer matrix		a_{ij} = min(i, j) ÷ max(i, j).	A positive symmetric matrix.
Matrix of ones	A matrix with all entries equal to one.	a_{ij} = 1.	
Pascal matrix	A matrix containing the entries of Pascal's triangle.		
Pauli matrices	A set of three 2 × 2 complex Hermitian and unitary matrices. When combined with the I_{2} identity matrix, they form an orthogonal basis for the 2 × 2 complex Hermitian matrices.		
Redheffer matrix	Encodes a Dirichlet convolution. Matrix entries are given by the divisor function; entries of the inverse are given by the Möbius function.	a_{ij} are 1 if i divides j or if j = 1; otherwise, a_{ij} = 0.	A (0, 1)-matrix.
Shift matrix	A matrix with ones on the superdiagonal or subdiagonal and zeroes elsewhere.	a_{ij} = δ_{i+1,j} or a_{ij} = δ_{i−1,j}	Multiplication by it shifts matrix elements by one position.
Zero matrix	A matrix with all entries equal to zero.	a_{ij} = 0.	

== Specific patterns for entries ==
The following lists matrices whose entries are subject to certain conditions. Many of them apply to square matrices only, that is matrices with the same number of columns and rows. The main diagonal of a square matrix is the diagonal joining the upper left corner and the lower right one or equivalently the entries a_{i,i}. The other diagonal is called anti-diagonal (or counter-diagonal).

Name	Explanation	Notes, references
(0,1)-matrix	A matrix with all elements either 0 or 1.	Synonym for binary matrix or logical matrix.
Alternant matrix	A matrix in which successive columns have a particular function applied to their entries.	
Alternating sign matrix	A square matrix with entries 0, 1 and −1 such that the sum of each row and column is 1 and the nonzero entries in each row and column alternate in sign.	
Anti-diagonal matrix	A square matrix with all entries off the anti-diagonal equal to zero.	
Anti-Hermitian matrix		Synonym for skew-Hermitian matrix.
Anti-symmetric matrix		Synonym for skew-symmetric matrix.
Arrowhead matrix	A square matrix containing zeros in all entries except for the first row, first column, and main diagonal.	
Band matrix	A square matrix whose non-zero entries are confined to a diagonal band.	
Bidiagonal matrix	A matrix with elements only on the main diagonal and either the superdiagonal or subdiagonal.	Sometimes defined differently, see article.
Binary matrix	A matrix whose entries are all either 0 or 1.	Synonym for (0,1)-matrix or logical matrix.
Bisymmetric matrix	A square matrix that is symmetric with respect to its main diagonal and its main cross-diagonal.	
Block-diagonal matrix	A block matrix with entries only on the diagonal.	
Block matrix	A matrix partitioned in sub-matrices called blocks.	
Block tridiagonal matrix	A block matrix which is essentially a tridiagonal matrix but with submatrices in place of scalar elements.	
Boolean matrix	A matrix whose entries are taken from a Boolean algebra.	
Cauchy matrix	A matrix whose elements are of the form 1/(x_{i} + y_{j}) for (x_{i}), (y_{j}) injective sequences (i.e., taking every value only once).	
Centrosymmetric matrix	A matrix symmetric about its center; i.e., a_{ij} = a_{n−i+1,n−j+1}.	
Circulant matrix	A matrix where each row is a circular shift of its predecessor.	
Conference matrix	A square matrix with zero diagonal and +1 and −1 off the diagonal, such that C^{T}C is a multiple of the identity matrix.	
Complex Hadamard matrix	A matrix with all rows and columns mutually orthogonal, whose entries are unimodular.	
Compound matrix	A matrix whose entries are generated by the determinants of all minors of a matrix.	
Copositive matrix	A square matrix A with real coefficients, such that $f(x) = x^T A x$ is nonnegative for every nonnegative vector x	
Diagonally dominant matrix	A matrix whose entries satisfy $|a_{ii}| > \sum_{j \ne i} |a_{ij}|$.	
Diagonal matrix	A square matrix with all entries outside the main diagonal equal to zero.	
Discrete Fourier-transform matrix	Multiplying by a vector gives the DFT of the vector as result.	
Elementary matrix	A square matrix derived by applying an elementary row operation to the identity matrix.	
Equivalent matrix	A matrix that can be derived from another matrix through a sequence of elementary row or column operations.	
Frobenius matrix	A square matrix in the form of an identity matrix but with arbitrary entries in one column below the main diagonal.	
GCD matrix	The $n\times n$ matrix $(S)$ having the greatest common divisor $(x_i, x_j)$ as its $ij$ entry, where $x_i, x_j\in S$.	
Generalized permutation matrix	A square matrix with precisely one nonzero element in each row and column.	
Hadamard matrix	A square matrix with entries +1, −1 whose rows are mutually orthogonal.	
Hankel matrix	A matrix with constant skew-diagonals; also an upside down Toeplitz matrix.	A square Hankel matrix is symmetric.
Hermitian matrix	A square matrix which is equal to its conjugate transpose, A = A^{*}.	
Hessenberg matrix	An "almost" triangular matrix, for example, an upper Hessenberg matrix has zero entries below the first subdiagonal.	
Hollow matrix	A square matrix whose main diagonal comprises only zero elements.	
Integer matrix	A matrix whose entries are all integers.	
Logical matrix	A matrix with all entries either 0 or 1.	Synonym for (0,1)-matrix, binary matrix or Boolean matrix. Can be used to represent a k-adic relation.
Markov matrix	A matrix of non-negative real numbers, such that the entries in each row sum to 1.	
Metzler matrix	A matrix whose off-diagonal entries are non-negative.	
Monomial matrix	A square matrix with exactly one non-zero entry in each row and column.	Synonym for generalized permutation matrix.
Moore matrix	A row consists of a, a^{q}, a^{q²}, etc., and each row uses a different variable.	
Nekrasov matrix		
Nonnegative matrix	A matrix with all nonnegative entries.	
Null-symmetric matrix	A square matrix whose null space (or kernel) is equal to its transpose, N(A) = N(A^{T}) or ker(A) = ker(A^{T}).	Synonym for kernel-symmetric matrices. Examples include (but not limited to) symmetric, skew-symmetric, and normal matrices.
Null-Hermitian matrix	A square matrix whose null space (or kernel) is equal to its conjugate transpose, N(A)=N(A^{*}) or ker(A)=ker(A^{*}).	Synonym for kernel-Hermitian matrices. Examples include (but not limited) to Hermitian, skew-Hermitian matrices, and normal matrices.
Partitioned matrix	A matrix partitioned into sub-matrices, or equivalently, a matrix whose entries are themselves matrices rather than scalars.	Synonym for block matrix.
Parisi matrix	A block-hierarchical matrix. It consist of growing blocks placed along the diagonal, each block is itself a Parisi matrix of a smaller size.	In theory of spin-glasses is also known as a replica matrix.
Pentadiagonal matrix	A matrix with the only nonzero entries on the main diagonal and the two diagonals just above and below the main one.	
Permutation matrix	A matrix representation of a permutation, a square matrix with exactly one 1 in each row and column, and all other elements 0.	
Persymmetric matrix	A matrix that is symmetric about its northeast–southwest diagonal, i.e., a_{ij} = a_{n−j+1,n−i+1}.	
Polynomial matrix	A matrix whose entries are polynomials.	
Positive matrix	A matrix with all positive entries.	
Quaternionic matrix	A matrix whose entries are quaternions.	
Random matrix	A matrix whose entries are random variables	
Sign matrix	A matrix whose entries are either +1, 0, or −1.	
Signature matrix	A diagonal matrix where the diagonal elements are either +1 or −1.	
Single-entry matrix	A matrix where a single element is one and the rest of the elements are zero.	
Skew-Hermitian matrix	A square matrix which is equal to the negative of its conjugate transpose, A^{*} = −A.	
Skew-symmetric matrix	A matrix which is equal to the negative of its transpose, A^{T} = −A.	
Skyline matrix	A rearrangement of the entries of a banded matrix which requires less space.	
Sparse matrix	A matrix with relatively few non-zero elements.	Sparse matrix algorithms can tackle huge sparse matrices that are utterly impractical for dense matrix algorithms.
Symmetric matrix	A square matrix which is equal to its transpose, A = A^{T} (a_{i,j} = a_{j,i}).	
Toeplitz matrix	A matrix with constant diagonals.	
Totally positive matrix	A matrix with determinants of all its square submatrices positive.	
Triangular matrix	A matrix with all entries above the main diagonal equal to zero (lower triangular) or with all entries below the main diagonal equal to zero (upper triangular).	
Tridiagonal matrix	A matrix with the only nonzero entries on the main diagonal and the diagonals just above and below the main one.	
X–Y–Z matrix	A generalization to three dimensions of the concept of two-dimensional array	
Vandermonde matrix	A row consists of 1, a, a^{2}, a^{3}, etc., and each row uses a different variable.	
Walsh matrix	A square matrix, with dimensions a power of 2, the entries of which are +1 or −1, and the property that the dot product of any two distinct rows (or columns) is zero.	
Z-matrix	A matrix with all off-diagonal entries less than zero.	

== Matrices satisfying some equations ==
A number of matrix-related notions is about properties of products or inverses of the given matrix. The matrix product of a m-by-n matrix A and a n-by-k matrix B is the m-by-k matrix C given by

$(C)_{i,j} = \sum_{r=1}^n A_{i,r}B_{r,j}.$

This matrix product is denoted AB. Unlike the product of numbers, matrix products are not commutative, that is to say AB need not be equal to BA. A number of notions are concerned with the failure of this commutativity. An inverse of square matrix A is a matrix B (necessarily of the same dimension as A) such that AB = I. Equivalently, BA = I. An inverse need not exist. If it exists, B is uniquely determined, and is also called the inverse of A, denoted A^{−1}.

Name	Explanation	Notes
Circular matrix or Coninvolutory matrix	A matrix whose inverse is equal to its entrywise complex conjugate: A^{−1} = A̅.	Compare with unitary matrices.
Congruent matrix	Two matrices A and B are congruent if there exists an invertible matrix P such that P^{T} A P = B.	Compare with similar matrices.
EP matrix or Range-Hermitian matrix	A square matrix that commutes with its Moore–Penrose inverse: AA^{+} = A^{+}A.	
Idempotent matrix or Projection Matrix	A matrix that has the property A² = AA = A.	The name projection matrix inspires from the observation of projection of a point multiple times onto a subspace(plane or a line) giving the same result as one projection.
Invertible matrix	A square matrix having a multiplicative inverse, that is, a matrix B such that AB = BA = I.	Invertible matrices form the general linear group.
Involutory matrix	A square matrix which is its own inverse, i.e., AA = I.	Signature matrices, Householder matrices (Also known as 'reflection matrices' to reflect a point about a plane or line) have this property.
Isometric matrix	A matrix that preserves distances, i.e., a matrix that satisfies A^{*}A = I where A^{*} denotes the conjugate transpose of A.	
Nilpotent matrix	A square matrix satisfying A^{q} = 0 for some positive integer q.	Equivalently, the only eigenvalue of A is 0.
Normal matrix	A square matrix that commutes with its conjugate transpose: AA^{∗} = A^{∗}A	They are the matrices to which the spectral theorem applies.
Orthogonal matrix	A matrix whose inverse is equal to its transpose, A^{−1} = A^{T}.	They form the orthogonal group.
Orthonormal matrix	A matrix whose columns are orthonormal vectors.	
Partially Isometric matrix	A matrix that is an isometry on the orthogonal complement of its kernel. Equivalently, a matrix that satisfies AA^{*}A = A.	Equivalently, a matrix with singular values that are either 0 or 1.
Singular matrix	A square matrix that is not invertible.	
Unimodular matrix	An invertible matrix with entries in the integers (integer matrix)	Necessarily the determinant is +1 or −1.
Unipotent matrix	A square matrix with all eigenvalues equal to 1.	Equivalently, A − I is nilpotent. See also unipotent group.
Unitary matrix	A square matrix whose inverse is equal to its conjugate transpose, A^{−1} = A^{*}.	
Totally unimodular matrix	A matrix for which every non-singular square submatrix is unimodular. This has some implications in the linear programming relaxation of an integer program.	
Weighing matrix	A square matrix the entries of which are in {0, 1, −1}, such that AA^{T} = wI for some positive integer w.	

== Matrices with conditions on eigenvalues or eigenvectors ==
Name	Explanation	Notes
Convergent matrix	A square matrix whose successive powers approach the zero matrix.	Its eigenvalues have magnitude less than one.
Defective matrix	A square matrix that does not have a complete basis of eigenvectors, and is thus not diagonalizable.	
Derogatory matrix	A square matrix whose minimal polynomial is of order less than n. Equivalently, at least one of its eigenvalues has at least two Jordan blocks.	
Diagonalizable matrix	A square matrix similar to a diagonal matrix.	It has an eigenbasis, that is, a complete set of linearly independent eigenvectors.
Hurwitz matrix	A matrix whose eigenvalues have strictly negative real part. A stable system of differential equations may be represented by a Hurwitz matrix.	
M-matrix	A Z-matrix with eigenvalues whose real parts are nonnegative.	
Positive-definite matrix	A Hermitian matrix with every eigenvalue positive.	
Stability matrix		Synonym for Hurwitz matrix.
Stieltjes matrix	A real symmetric positive definite matrix with nonpositive off-diagonal entries.	Special case of an M-matrix.

== Matrices generated by specific data ==
Name	Definition	Comments
Adjugate matrix	Transpose of the cofactor matrix	The inverse of a matrix is its adjugate matrix divided by its determinant
Augmented matrix	Matrix whose rows are concatenations of the rows of two smaller matrices	Used for performing the same row operations on two matrices
Bézout matrix	Square matrix whose determinant is the resultant of two polynomials	See also Sylvester matrix
Jabotinsky matrix	Infinite matrix of the Taylor coefficients of an analytic function and its integer powers	The composition of two functions can be expressed as the product of their Jabotinsky matrices
Cartan matrix	A matrix associated with either a finite-dimensional associative algebra, or a semisimple Lie algebra	
Cofactor matrix	Formed by the cofactors of a square matrix, that is, the signed minors, of the matrix	Transpose of the Adjugate matrix
Companion matrix	A matrix having the coefficients of a polynomial as last column, and having the polynomial as its characteristic polynomial	
Coxeter matrix	A matrix which describes the relations between the involutions that generate a Coxeter group	
Distance matrix	The square matrix formed by the pairwise distances of a set of points	Euclidean distance matrix is a special case
Euclidean distance matrix	A matrix that describes the pairwise distances between points in Euclidean space	See also distance matrix
Fundamental matrix	The matrix formed from the fundamental solutions of a system of linear differential equations	
Generator matrix	In Coding theory, a matrix whose rows span a linear code	
Gramian matrix	The symmetric matrix of the pairwise inner products of a set of vectors in an inner product space	
Hessian matrix	The square matrix of second partial derivatives of a function of several variables	
Householder matrix	The matrix of a reflection with respect to a hyperplane passing through the origin	
Jacobian matrix	The matrix of the partial derivatives of a function of several variables	
Moment matrix		Used in statistics and Sum-of-squares optimization
Payoff matrix	A matrix in game theory and economics, that represents the payoffs in a normal form game where players move simultaneously	
Pick matrix	A matrix that occurs in the study of analytical interpolation problems	
Rotation matrix	A matrix representing a rotation	
Seifert matrix	A matrix in knot theory, primarily for the algebraic analysis of topological properties of knots and links.	Alexander polynomial
Shear matrix	The matrix of a shear transformation	
Similarity matrix	A matrix of scores which express the similarity between two data points	Sequence alignment
Sylvester matrix	A square matrix whose entries come from the coefficients of two polynomials	The Sylvester matrix is nonsingular if and only if the two polynomials are coprime to each other
Symplectic matrix	The real matrix of a symplectic transformation	
Transformation matrix	The matrix of a linear transformation or a geometric transformation	
Wedderburn matrix	A matrix of the form $A - (y^T A x)^{-1} A x y^T A$, used for rank-reduction & biconjugate decompositions	Analysis of matrix decompositions

== Matrices used in statistics ==
The following matrices find their main application in statistics and probability theory.

- Bernoulli matrix — a square matrix with entries +1, −1, with equal probability of each.
- Centering matrix — a matrix which, when multiplied with a vector, has the same effect as subtracting the mean of the components of the vector from every component.
- Correlation matrix — a symmetric n×n matrix, formed by the pairwise correlation coefficients of several random variables.
- Covariance matrix — a symmetric n×n matrix, formed by the pairwise covariances of several random variables. Sometimes called a dispersion matrix.
- Dispersion matrix — another name for a covariance matrix.
- Doubly stochastic matrix — a non-negative matrix such that each row and each column sums to 1 (thus the matrix is both left stochastic and right stochastic)
- Fisher information matrix — a matrix representing the variance of the partial derivative, with respect to a parameter, of the log of the likelihood function of a random variable.
- Hat matrix — a square matrix used in statistics to relate fitted values to observed values.
- Orthostochastic matrix — doubly stochastic matrix whose entries are the squares of the absolute values of the entries of some orthogonal matrix
- Precision matrix — a symmetric n×n matrix, formed by inverting the covariance matrix. Also called the information matrix.
- Stochastic matrix — a non-negative matrix describing a stochastic process. The sum of entries of any row is one.
- Transition matrix — a matrix representing the probabilities of conditions changing from one state to another in a Markov chain
- Unistochastic matrix — a doubly stochastic matrix whose entries are the squares of the absolute values of the entries of some unitary matrix

== Matrices used in graph theory ==
The following matrices find their main application in graph and network theory.

- Adjacency matrix — a square matrix representing a graph, with a_{ij} non-zero if vertex i and vertex j are adjacent.
- Biadjacency matrix — a special class of adjacency matrix that describes adjacency in bipartite graphs.
- Degree matrix — a diagonal matrix defining the degree of each vertex in a graph.
- Edmonds matrix — a square matrix of a bipartite graph.
- Incidence matrix — a matrix representing a relationship between two classes of objects (usually vertices and edges in the context of graph theory).
- Laplacian matrix — a matrix equal to the degree matrix minus the adjacency matrix for a graph, used to find the number of spanning trees in the graph.
- Seidel adjacency matrix — a matrix similar to the usual adjacency matrix but with −1 for adjacency; +1 for nonadjacency; 0 on the diagonal.
- Skew-adjacency matrix — an adjacency matrix in which each non-zero a_{ij} is 1 or −1, accordingly as the direction i → j matches or opposes that of an initially specified orientation.
- Tutte matrix — a generalization of the Edmonds matrix for a balanced bipartite graph.

== Matrices used in science and engineering ==
- Cabibbo–Kobayashi–Maskawa matrix — a unitary matrix used in particle physics to describe the strength of flavour-changing weak decays.
- Density matrix — a matrix describing the statistical state of a quantum system. Hermitian, non-negative and with trace 1.
- Fundamental matrix (computer vision) — a 3 × 3 matrix in computer vision that relates corresponding points in stereo images.
- Fuzzy associative matrix — a matrix in artificial intelligence, used in machine learning processes.
- Gamma matrices — 4 × 4 matrices in quantum field theory.
- Gell-Mann matrices — a generalization of the Pauli matrices; these matrices are one notable representation of the infinitesimal generators of the special unitary group SU(3).
- Hamiltonian matrix — a matrix used in a variety of fields, including quantum mechanics and linear-quadratic regulator (LQR) systems.
- Irregular matrix — a matrix used in computer science which has a varying number of elements in each row.
- Overlap matrix — a type of Gramian matrix, used in quantum chemistry to describe the inter-relationship of a set of basis vectors of a quantum system.
- S matrix — a matrix in quantum mechanics that connects asymptotic (infinite past and future) particle states.
- Scattering matrix - a matrix in Microwave Engineering that describes how the power move in a multiport system.
- State transition matrix — exponent of state matrix in control systems.
- Substitution matrix — a matrix from bioinformatics, which describes mutation rates of amino acid or DNA sequences.
- Supnick matrix — a square matrix used in computer science.
- Z-matrix — a matrix in chemistry, representing a molecule in terms of its relative atomic geometry.

== Specific matrices ==
- Wilson matrix, a matrix used as an example for test purposes.

== Other matrix-related terms and definitions ==
- Jordan canonical form — an 'almost' diagonalised matrix, where the only non-zero elements appear on the lead and superdiagonals.
- Linear independence — two or more vectors are linearly independent if there is no way to construct one from linear combinations of the others.
- Matrix exponential — defined by the exponential series.
- Matrix representation of conic sections
- Pseudoinverse — a generalization of the inverse matrix.
- Row echelon form — a matrix in this form is the result of applying the forward elimination procedure to a matrix (as used in Gaussian elimination).
- Wronskian — the determinant of a matrix of functions and their derivatives such that row n is the (n−1)^{th} derivative of row one.

== See also ==
- Perfect matrix
