= Integer matrix =

Matrix whose entries are integers

In mathematics, an integer matrix is a matrix whose entries are all integers. Examples include binary matrices, the zero matrix, the matrix of ones, the identity matrix, and the adjacency matrices used in graph theory, amongst many others. Integer matrices find frequent application in combinatorics.

== Examples ==
$\left(\begin{array}{cccr} 5 & 2 & 6 & 0\\ 4 & 7 & 3 & 8\\ 5 & 9 & 0 & 4\\ 3 & 1 & 0 & \!\!\!-3\\ 9 & 0 & 2 & 1\end{array}\right)$ and $\left(\begin{array}{ccc} 1 & 5 & 0\\ 0 & 9 & 2\\ 1 & 7 & 3\end{array}\right)$

are both examples of integer matrices.

== Properties ==
Invertibility of integer matrices is in general more numerically stable than that of non-integer matrices. The determinant of an integer matrix $M$ is itself an integer, and the adjugate matrix of an integer matrix is also integer matrix. Thus, the determinant of an invertible integer matrix is $1$ or $-1$, and hence where inverses exist they do not become excessively large (see condition number). Theorems from matrix theory that infer properties from determinants thus avoid the traps induced by ill conditioned (nearly zero determinant) real or floating point valued matrices.

The inverse of an integer matrix $M$ is again an integer matrix if and only if the determinant of $M$ equals $1$ or $-1$. Integer matrices of determinant $1$ form the group $\mathrm{SL}_n(\mathbf{Z})$, which has far-reaching applications in arithmetic and geometry. For $n=2$, it is closely related to the modular group.

The intersection of the integer matrices with the orthogonal group is the group of signed permutation matrices.

The characteristic polynomial of an integer matrix has integer coefficients. Since the eigenvalues of a matrix are the roots of this polynomial, the eigenvalues of an integer matrix are algebraic integers. In dimension less than 5, they can thus be expressed by radicals involving integers.

Integer matrices are sometimes called integral matrices, although this use is discouraged.

== See also ==
- GCD matrix
- Unimodular matrix
- Wilson matrix
