= Pascal matrix =

Infinite matrices with Pascal's triangle as elements

In matrix theory and combinatorics, a Pascal matrix is a matrix (possibly infinite) containing the binomial coefficients as its elements. It is thus an encoding of Pascal's triangle in matrix form. There are three natural ways to achieve this: as a lower-triangular matrix, an upper-triangular matrix, or a symmetric matrix. For example, the 5 × 5 matrices are:

$$L_5 = \begin{pmatrix}
1 & 0 & 0 & 0 & 0 \\
1 & 1 & 0 & 0 & 0 \\
1 & 2 & 1 & 0 & 0 \\
1 & 3 & 3 & 1 & 0 \\
1 & 4 & 6 & 4 & 1
\end{pmatrix}\,\,\,$$
$$U_5 = \begin{pmatrix}
1 & 1 & 1 & 1 & 1 \\
0 & 1 & 2 & 3 & 4 \\
0 & 0 & 1 & 3 & 6 \\
0 & 0 & 0 & 1 & 4 \\
0 & 0 & 0 & 0 & 1
\end{pmatrix}\,\,\,$$
$$S_5 = \begin{pmatrix}
1 & 1 & 1 & 1 & 1 \\
1 & 2 & 3 & 4 & 5 \\
1 & 3 & 6 & 10 & 15 \\
1 & 4 & 10 & 20 & 35 \\
1 & 5 & 15 & 35 & 70
\end{pmatrix}=L_5 \times U_5$$
There are other ways in which Pascal's triangle can be put into matrix form, but these are not easily extended to infinity.

== Definition ==
The non-zero elements of a Pascal matrix are given by the binomial coefficients:

$$L_{ij} = {i \choose j} = \frac{i!}{j!(i-j)!}, j \le i$$
$$U_{ij} = {j \choose i} = \frac{j!}{i!(j-i)!}, i \le j$$
$$S_{ij} = {i+j \choose i} = {i+j \choose j} = \frac{(i+j)!}{i!j!}$$

such that the indices i, j start at 0, and ! denotes the factorial. These matrices along with related variants arise naturally in the study of Hermite and Laguerre polynomials.

== Properties ==
The matrices have the pleasing relationship S_{n} = L_{n}U_{n}. From this it is easily seen that all three matrices have determinant 1, as the determinant of a triangular matrix is simply the product of its diagonal elements, which are all 1 for both L_{n} and U_{n}. In other words, matrices S_{n}, L_{n}, and U_{n} are unimodular, with L_{n} and U_{n} having trace n.

The trace of S_{n} is given by

$$\text{tr}(S_n) = \sum^n_{i=1} \frac{ [ 2(i-1) ] !}{[(i-1)!]^2} = \sum^{n-1}_{k=0} \frac{ (2k) !}{(k!)^2}$$

with the first few terms given by the sequence 1, 3, 9, 29, 99, 351, 1275, ... (sequence A006134 in the OEIS).

The matrix S_{n} is similar to its inverse, and consequently the eigenvalues of S_{n} come in reciprocal pairs, ie. λ is an eigenvalue if and only if 1/λ is an eigenvalue. Consequently, for odd values of n the matrix S_{n} has an eigenvalue of 1. If n = p^{k} for an odd prime p, an eigenvector with eigenvalue 1 is directly related to counting points on elliptic curves over finite fields and local zeta functions.

== Construction ==
A Pascal matrix can actually be constructed by taking the matrix exponential of a special subdiagonal or superdiagonal matrix. The example below constructs a 7 × 7 Pascal matrix, but the method works for any desired n × n Pascal matrices. The dots in the following matrices represent zero elements.

$$\begin{array}{lll}
& L_7=\exp
\left (
\left [
\begin{smallmatrix}
. & . & . & . & . & . & . \\
1 & . & . & . & . & . & . \\
. & 2 & . & . & . & . & . \\
. & . & 3 & . & . & . & . \\
. & . & . & 4 & . & . & . \\
. & . & . & . & 5 & . & . \\
. & . & . & . & . & 6 & .
\end{smallmatrix}
\right ]
\right )
=
\left [
\begin{smallmatrix}
1   & .   & .   & .   & .   & .   & .   \\
1   & 1   & .   & .   & .   & .   & .   \\
1   & 2   & 1   & .   & .   & .   & .   \\
1   & 3   & 3   & 1   & .   & .   & .   \\
1   & 4   & 6   & 4   & 1   & .   & .   \\
1   & 5   & 10  & 10  & 5   & 1   & .   \\
1   & 6   & 15  & 20  & 15  & 6   & 1
\end{smallmatrix}
\right ]
;\quad
\\
\\
& U_7=\exp
\left (
\left [
\begin{smallmatrix}
{\color{white}1}. & 1 & . & . & . & . & . \\
{\color{white}1}. & . & 2 & . & . & . & . \\
{\color{white}1}. & . & . & 3 & . & . & . \\
{\color{white}1}. & . & . & . & 4 & . & . \\
{\color{white}1}. & . & . & . & . & 5 & . \\
{\color{white}1}. & . & . & . & . & . & 6 \\
{\color{white}1}. & . & . & . & . & . & .
\end{smallmatrix}
\right ]
\right )
=
\left [
\begin{smallmatrix}
1   & 1   & 1   & 1   & 1   & 1   & 1   \\
.   & 1   & 2   & 3   & 4   & 5   & 6   \\
.   & .   & 1   & 3   & 6   & 10  & 15  \\
.   & .   & .   & 1   & 4   & 10  & 20  \\
.   & .   & .   & .   & 1   & 5   & 15  \\
.   & .   & .   & .   & .   & 1   & 6   \\
.   & .   & .   & .   & .   & .   & 1
\end{smallmatrix}
\right ]
;
\\
\\
\therefore & S_7
=\exp
\left (
\left [
\begin{smallmatrix}
. & . & . & . & . & . & . \\
1 & . & . & . & . & . & . \\
. & 2 & . & . & . & . & . \\
. & . & 3 & . & . & . & . \\
. & . & . & 4 & . & . & . \\
. & . & . & . & 5 & . & . \\
. & . & . & . & . & 6 & .
\end{smallmatrix}
\right ]
\right )
\exp
\left (
\left [
\begin{smallmatrix}
{\color{white}i}. & 1 & . & . & . & . & . \\
{\color{white}i}. & . & 2 & . & . & . & . \\
{\color{white}i}. & . & . & 3 & . & . & . \\
{\color{white}i}. & . & . & . & 4 & . & . \\
{\color{white}i}. & . & . & . & . & 5 & . \\
{\color{white}i}. & . & . & . & . & . & 6 \\
{\color{white}i}. & . & . & . & . & . & .
\end{smallmatrix}
\right ]
\right )
=
\left [
\begin{smallmatrix}
1   & 1   & 1   & 1   & 1   & 1   & 1   \\
1   & 2   & 3   & 4   & 5   & 6   & 7   \\
1   & 3   & 6   & 10  & 15  & 21  & 28  \\
1   & 4   & 10  & 20  & 35  & 56  & 84  \\
1   & 5   & 15  & 35  & 70  & 126 & 210 \\
1   & 6   & 21  & 56  & 126 & 252 & 462 \\
1   & 7   & 28  & 84  & 210 & 462 & 924
\end{smallmatrix}
\right ].
\end{array}$$

One cannot simply assume exp(A) exp(B) = exp(A + B), for n × n matrices A and B; this equality is only true when AB = BA (i.e. when the matrices A and B commute). In the construction of symmetric Pascal matrices like that above, the sub- and superdiagonal matrices do not commute, so the (perhaps) tempting simplification involving the addition of the matrices cannot be made.

A useful property of the sub- and superdiagonal matrices used for the construction is that both are nilpotent; that is, when raised to a sufficiently great integer power, they degenerate into the zero matrix. (See shift matrix for further details.) As the n × n generalised shift matrices we are using become zero when raised to power n, when calculating the matrix exponential we need only consider the first n + 1 terms of the infinite series to obtain an exact result.

== Variants ==
Interesting variants can be obtained by obvious modification of the matrix-logarithm PL_{7} and then application of the matrix exponential.

The first example below uses the squares of the values of the log-matrix and constructs a 7 × 7 "Laguerre"- matrix (or matrix of coefficients of Laguerre polynomials

$$\begin{array}{lll}
& LAG_7=\exp
\left (
\left [
\begin{smallmatrix}
. & . & . & . & . & . & . \\
1 & . & . & . & . & . & . \\
. & 4 & . & . & . & . & . \\
. & . & 9 & . & . & . & . \\
. & . & . & 16 & . & . & . \\
. & . & . & . & 25 & . & . \\
. & . & . & . & . & 36 & .
\end{smallmatrix}
\right ]
\right )
=
\left [
\begin{smallmatrix}
1 &      . &      . &      . &     . &    . &   .   \\
1 &      1 &      . &      . &     . &    . &   .   \\
2 &      4 &      1 &      . &     . &    . &   .   \\
6 &     18 &      9 &      1 &     . &    . &   .   \\
24 &     96 &     72 &     16 &     1 &    . &   .   \\
120 &    600 &    600 &    200 &    25 &    1 &   .   \\
720 &   4320 &   5400 &   2400 &   450 &   36 &   1
\end{smallmatrix}
\right ]
;\quad
\end{array}$$

The Laguerre-matrix is actually used with some other scaling and/or the scheme of alternating signs. (Literature about generalizations to higher powers is not found yet)

The second example below uses the products v(v + 1) of the values of the log-matrix and constructs a 7 × 7 "Lah"- matrix (or matrix of coefficients of Lah numbers)

$$\begin{array}{lll}
& LAH_7 = \exp
\left (
\left [
\begin{smallmatrix}
. & . & . & . & . & . & . \\
2 & . & . & . & . & . & . \\
. & 6 & . & . & . & . & . \\
. & . &12 & . & . & . & . \\
. & . & . & 20 & . & . & . \\
. & . & . & . & 30 & . & . \\
. & . & . & . & . & 42 & .
\end{smallmatrix}
\right ]
\right )
=
\left [
\begin{smallmatrix}
1 & . & . & . & . & . & . & . \\
2 & 1 & . & . & . & . & . & . \\
6 & 6 & 1 & . & . & . & . & . \\
24 & 36 & 12 & 1 & . & . & . & . \\
120 & 240 & 120 & 20 & 1 & . & . & . \\
720 & 1800 & 1200 & 300 & 30 & 1 & . & . \\
5040 & 15120 & 12600 & 4200 & 630 & 42 & 1 & . \\
40320 & 141120 & 141120 & 58800 & 11760 & 1176 & 56 & 1
\end{smallmatrix}
\right ]
;\quad
\end{array}$$

Using v(v − 1) instead provides a diagonal shifting to bottom-right.

The third example below uses the square of the original PL_{7}-matrix, divided by 2, in other words: the first-order binomials (binomial(k, 2)) in the second subdiagonal and constructs a matrix, which occurs in context of the derivatives and integrals of the Gaussian error function:

$$\begin{array}{lll}
& GS_7 = \exp
\left (
\left [
\begin{smallmatrix}
. & . & . & . & . & . & . \\
. & . & . & . & . & . & . \\
1 & . & . & . & . & . & . \\
. & 3 & . & . & . & . & . \\
. & . & 6 & . & . & . & . \\
. & . & . & 10 & . & . & . \\
. & . & . & . & 15 & . & .
\end{smallmatrix}
\right ]
\right )
=
\left [
\begin{smallmatrix}
1 &    . &    . &    . &    . &   . &   .   \\
. &    1 &    . &    . &    . &   . &   .   \\
1 &    . &    1 &    . &    . &   . &   .   \\
. &    3 &    . &    1 &    . &   . &   .   \\
3 &    . &    6 &    . &    1 &   . &   .   \\
. &   15 &    . &   10 &    . &   1 &   .   \\
15 &    . &   45 &    . &   15 &   . &   1
\end{smallmatrix}
\right ]
;\quad
\end{array}$$

If this matrix is inverted (using, for instance, the negative matrix-logarithm), then this matrix has alternating signs and gives the coefficients of the derivatives (and by extension the integrals) of Gauss' error-function. (Literature about generalizations to greater powers is not found yet.)

Another variant can be obtained by extending the original matrix to negative values:

$$\begin{array}{lll}
& \exp
\left (
\left [
\begin{smallmatrix}
. & . & . & . & . & . & . & . & . & . & . & . \\
-5& . & . & . & . & . & . & . & . & . & . & . \\
. &-4 & . & . & . & . & . & . & . & . & . & . \\
. & . &-3 & . & . & . & . & . & . & . & . & . \\
. & . & . &-2 & . & . & . & . & . & . & . & . \\
. & . & . & . &-1 & . & . & . & . & . & . & . \\
. & . & . & . & . & 0 & . & . & . & . & . & . \\
. & . & . & . & . & . & 1 & . & . & . & . & . \\
. & . & . & . & . & . & . & 2 & . & . & . & . \\
. & . & . & . & . & . & . & . & 3 & . & . & . \\
. & . & . & . & . & . & . & . & . & 4 & . & . \\
. & . & . & . & . & . & . & . & . & . & 5 & .
\end{smallmatrix}
\right ]
\right )
=
\left [
\begin{smallmatrix}
1   & .   & .   & .   & .   & .   & .   & .   & .   & .   & .   & .   \\
-5  & 1   & .   & .   & .   & .   & .   & .   & .   & .   & .   & .   \\
10  & -4  & 1   & .   & .   & .   & .   & .   & .   & .   & .   & .   \\
-10 & 6   & -3  & 1   & .   & .   & .   & .   & .   & .   & .   & .   \\
5   & -4  & 3   & -2  & 1   & .   & .   & .   & .   & .   & .   & .   \\
-1  & 1   & -1  & 1   & -1  & 1   & .   & .   & .   & .   & .   & .   \\
.   & .   & .   & .   & .   & 0   & 1   & .   & .   & .   & .   & .   \\
.   & .   & .   & .   & .   & .   & 1   & 1   & .   & .   & .   & .   \\
.   & .   & .   & .   & .   & .   & 1   & 2   & 1   & .   & .   & .   \\
.   & .   & .   & .   & .   & .   & 1   & 3   & 3   & 1   & .   & .   \\
.   & .   & .   & .   & .   & .   & 1   & 4   & 6   & 4   & 1   & .   \\
.   & .   & .   & .   & .   & .   & 1   & 5   & 10  & 10  & 5   & 1
\end{smallmatrix}
\right ]
.
\end{array}$$

== See also ==
- Pascal's triangle
- LU decomposition
- Riordan Array
