= Completely-S matrix =

Square matrix in linear algebra

In linear algebra, a completely-S matrix is a square matrix such that for every principal submatrix R there exists a positive vector u such that Ru > 0.
