= Single-entry =

Single-entry may refer to:

- Single-entry bookkeeping system, a method of bookkeeping relying on a one-sided accounting entry to maintain financial information
- Single-entry matrix, a matrix where a single element is one and the rest of the elements are zero
