= Monge array =

Type of mathematical object

In mathematics applied to computer science, Monge arrays, or Monge matrices, are mathematical objects named for their discoverer, the French mathematician Gaspard Monge.

An m-by-n matrix is said to be a Monge array if, for all $i, j, k, \ell$ such that
$$1\le i < k\le m\text{ and }1\le j < \ell\le n,$$
one obtains
$$A[i,j] + A[k,\ell] \le A[i,\ell] + A[k,j].$$
In other words, for any two rows and two columns of a Monge array, the four elements at the intersection points (a 2 × 2 sub-matrix) have the property that the sum of the upper-left and lower-right elements (on the main diagonal) is less than or equal to the sum of the lower-left and upper-right elements (on the antidiagonal).

This matrix is a Monge array:

$$\begin{bmatrix}
10 & 17 & 13 & 28 & 23 \\
17 & 22 & 16 & 29 & 23 \\
24 & 28 & 22 & 34 & 24 \\
11 & 13 & 6 & 17 & 7 \\
45 & 44 & 32 & 37 & 23 \\
36 & 33 & 19 & 21 & 6 \\
75 & 66 & 51 & 53 & 34 \end{bmatrix}$$

For example, take the intersection of rows 2 and 4 with columns 1 and 5. The four elements are
$$\begin{bmatrix}
17 & 23\\
11 & 7 \end{bmatrix}.$$
The sum of the upper-left and lower-right elements (17 + 7 = 24) is not larger than the sum of the lower-left and upper-right elements (23 + 11 = 34).

== Properties ==
- The above definition is equivalent to the statement

A matrix is a Monge array if and only if $A[i,j] + A[i+1,j+1]\le A[i,j+1] + A[i+1,j]$ for all $1\le i < m$ and $1\le j < n$.

- Any subarray produced by selecting certain rows and columns from an original Monge array will itself be a Monge array.
- Any linear combination with non-negative coefficients of Monge arrays is itself a Monge array.
- Every Monge array is totally monotone, meaning that its row minima occur in a nondecreasing sequence of columns, and that the same property is true for every subarray. This property allows the row minima to be found quickly by using the SMAWK algorithm. If you mark with a circle the leftmost minimum of each row, you will discover that your circles march downward to the right; that is to say, if $f(x) = \arg\min_{i\in \{1,\ldots,m\}} A[x,i]$, then $f(j)\le f(j+1)$ for all $1\le j < n$. Symmetrically, if you mark the uppermost minimum of each column, your circles will march rightwards and downwards. The row and column maxima march in the opposite direction: upwards to the right and downwards to the left.
- The notion of weak Monge arrays has been proposed; a weak Monge array is a square n-by-n matrix which satisfies the Monge property $A[i,i] + A[r,s]\le A[i,s] + A[r,i]$ only for all $1\le i < r,s\le n$.
- Monge matrix is just another name for submodular function of two discrete variables. Precisely, A is a Monge matrix if and only if A[i,j] is a submodular function of variables i,j.

== Applications ==
Monge matrices has applications in combinatorial optimization problems:

- When the traveling salesman problem has a cost matrix which is a Monge matrix it can be solved in quadratic time.
- A square Monge matrix which is also symmetric about its main diagonal is called a Supnick matrix (after Fred Supnick). Any linear combination of Supnick matrices is itself a Supnick matrix, and when the cost matrix in a traveling salesman problem is Supnick, the optimal solution is a predetermined route, unaffected by the specific values within the matrix.
