= Convergent matrix =

Matrix that converges to zero matrix

In linear algebra, a convergent matrix is a matrix that converges to the zero matrix under matrix exponentiation.

== Background ==
When successive powers of a matrix T become small (that is, when all of the entries of T approach zero, upon raising T to successive powers), the matrix T converges to the zero matrix. A regular splitting of a non-singular matrix A results in a convergent matrix T. A semi-convergent splitting of a matrix A results in a semi-convergent matrix T. A general iterative method converges for every initial vector if T is convergent, and under certain conditions if T is semi-convergent.

== Definition ==
We call an n × n matrix T a convergent matrix if

$\lim_{k \to \infty}( \mathbf T^k)_{ij} = 0,$	1

for each i = 1, 2, ..., n and j = 1, 2, ..., n.

== Example ==
Let

$$\begin{align}
& \mathbf{T} = \begin{pmatrix}
\frac{1}{4} & \frac{1}{2} \\[4pt]
0 & \frac{1}{4}
\end{pmatrix}.
\end{align}$$

Computing successive powers of T, we obtain

$$\begin{align}
& \mathbf{T}^2 = \begin{pmatrix}
\frac{1}{16} & \frac{1}{4} \\[4pt]
0 & \frac{1}{16}
\end{pmatrix}, \quad \mathbf{T}^3 = \begin{pmatrix}
\frac{1}{64} & \frac{3}{32} \\[4pt]
0 & \frac{1}{64}
\end{pmatrix}, \quad \mathbf{T}^4 = \begin{pmatrix}
\frac{1}{256} & \frac{1}{32} \\[4pt]
0 & \frac{1}{256}
\end{pmatrix}, \quad \mathbf{T}^5 = \begin{pmatrix}
\frac{1}{1024} & \frac{5}{512} \\[4pt]
0 & \frac{1}{1024}
\end{pmatrix},
\end{align}$$
$$\begin{align}
\mathbf{T}^6 = \begin{pmatrix}
\frac{1}{4096} & \frac{3}{1024} \\[4pt]
0 & \frac{1}{4096}
\end{pmatrix},
\end{align}$$

and, in general,

$$\begin{align}
\mathbf{T}^k = \begin{pmatrix}
(\frac{1}{4})^k & \frac{k}{2^{2k - 1}} \\[4pt]
0 & (\frac{1}{4})^k
\end{pmatrix}.
\end{align}$$

Since

$$\lim_{k \to \infty} \left( \frac{1}{4} \right)^k = 0$$

and

$$\lim_{k \to \infty} \frac{k}{2^{2k - 1}} = 0,$$

T is a convergent matrix. Note that ρ(T) = 1/4, where ρ(T) represents the spectral radius of T, since 1/4 is the only eigenvalue of T.

== Characterizations ==
Let T be an n × n matrix. The following properties are equivalent to T being a convergent matrix:

1. $\lim_{k \to \infty} \| \mathbf T^k \| = 0,$ for some natural norm;
2. $\lim_{k \to \infty} \| \mathbf T^k \| = 0,$ for all natural norms;
3. $\rho( \mathbf T ) < 1$;
4. $\lim_{k \to \infty} \mathbf T^k \mathbf x = \mathbf 0,$ for every x.

Where $\rho(\mathbf T)$ is the spectral radius, the maximum among the absolute values of the matrix's eigenvalues.

== Iterative methods ==
A general iterative method involves a process that converts the system of linear equations

$\mathbf{Ax} = \mathbf{b}$	2

into an equivalent system of the form

$\mathbf{x} = \mathbf{Tx} + \mathbf{c}$	3

for some matrix T and vector c. After the initial vector x^{(0)} is selected, the sequence of approximate solution vectors is generated by computing

$\mathbf{x}^{(k + 1)} = \mathbf{Tx}^{(k)} + \mathbf{c}$	4

for each k ≥ 0. For any initial vector x^{(0)} ∈ $\mathbb{R}^n$, the sequence $\lbrace \mathbf{x}^{ \left( k \right) } \rbrace _{k = 0}^{\infty}$ defined by (4), for each k ≥ 0 and c ≠ 0, converges to the unique solution of (3) if and only if ρ(T) < 1, that is, T is a convergent matrix.

=== Regular splitting ===
A matrix splitting is an expression which represents a given matrix as a sum or difference of matrices. In the system of linear equations (2) above, with A non-singular, the matrix A can be split, that is, written as a difference

$\mathbf{A} = \mathbf{B} - \mathbf{C}$	5

so that (2) can be re-written as (4) above. The expression (5) is a regular splitting of A if and only if B^{−1} ≥ 0 and C ≥ 0, that is, B^{−1} and C have only nonnegative entries. If the splitting (5) is a regular splitting of the matrix A and A^{−1} ≥ 0, then ρ(T) < 1 and T is a convergent matrix. Hence the method (4) converges.

== Semi-convergent matrix ==
We call an n × n matrix T a semi-convergent matrix if the limit

$\lim_{k \to \infty} \mathbf T^k$	6

exists. If A is possibly singular but (2) is consistent, that is, b is in the range of A, then the sequence defined by (4) converges to a solution to (2) for every x^{(0)} ∈ $\mathbb{R}^n$ if and only if T is semi-convergent. In this case, the splitting (5) is called a semi-convergent splitting of A.

== See also ==
- Gauss–Seidel method
- Jacobi method
- List of matrices
- Nilpotent matrix
- Successive over-relaxation
