= Supnick matrix =

A Supnick matrix or Supnick array – named after Fred Supnick of the City College of New York, who introduced the notion in 1957 – is a Monge array which is also a symmetric matrix.

== Mathematical definition ==
A Supnick matrix is a square Monge array that is symmetric around the main diagonal.

An n-by-n matrix is a Supnick matrix if, for all i, j, k, l such that if

$1\le i < k\le n$ and $1\le j < l\le n$

then

$$a_{ij} + a_{kl} \le a_{il} + a_{kj}\,$$

and also

$$a_{ij} = a_{ji}. \,$$

A logically equivalent definition is given by Rudolf & Woeginger who in 1995 proved that

A matrix is a Supnick matrix iff it can be written as the sum of a sum matrix S and a non-negative linear combination of LL-UR block matrices.

The sum matrix is defined in terms of a sequence of n real numbers {α_{i}}:

$$S = [s_{ij}] = [\alpha_i + \alpha_j]; \,$$

and an LL-UR block matrix consists of two symmetrically placed rectangles in the lower-left and upper right corners for which a_{ij} = 1, with all the rest of the matrix elements equal to zero.

== Properties ==
Adding two Supnick matrices together will result in a new Supnick matrix (Deineko and Woeginger 2006).

Multiplying a Supnick matrix by a non-negative real number produces a new Supnick matrix (Deineko and Woeginger 2006).

If the distance matrix in a traveling salesman problem can be written as a Supnick matrix, that particular instance of the problem admits an easy solution (even though the problem is, in general, NP hard).
