= Matrix mortality problem =

In computer science, the matrix mortality problem (or mortal matrix problem) is a decision problem that asks, given a set of size m of n×n matrices with integer coefficients, whether the zero matrix can be expressed as a finite product of matrices from this set.

The matrix mortality problem is known to be undecidable when n ≥ 3. In fact, it is already undecidable for sets of 6 matrices (or more) when n = 3, for 4 matrices when n = 5, for 3 matrices when n = 9, and for 2 matrices when n = 15.

In the case n = 2, it is an open problem whether matrix mortality is decidable, but several special cases have been solved: the problem is decidable for sets of 2 matrices, and for sets of matrices which contain at most one invertible matrix.

The current frontier of knowledge
n\m	1	2	3	4	5	6
2	✅	✅				
3	✅					✖️
4	✅					✖️
5	✅			✖️	✖️	✖️
...	✅			✖️	✖️	✖️
9	✅		✖️	✖️	✖️	✖️
...	✅		✖️	✖️	✖️	✖️
15	✅	✖️	✖️	✖️	✖️	✖️
