= Anti-diagonal matrix =

Matrix whose only nonzero entries lie on the lower-left-to-upper-right diagonal

In mathematics, an anti-diagonal matrix is a square matrix where all the entries are zero except those on the diagonal going from the lower left corner to the upper right corner (↗), known as the anti-diagonal (sometimes Harrison diagonal, secondary diagonal, trailing diagonal, minor diagonal, off diagonal or bad diagonal).

== Formal definition ==
An n × n matrix A is an anti-diagonal matrix if the (i, j)th element a_{ij} is zero for all rows i and columns j whose indices do not sum to n + 1. Symbolically,
$$a_{ij} = 0 \ \forall i,j  \in \left\{1, \ldots, n\right\},\ (i+j \ne n+1).$$

== Example ==
An example of an anti-diagonal matrix is
$$\begin{bmatrix}
0 & 0 & 0 & 0 & 2 \\
0 & 0 & 0 & 2 & 0 \\
0 & 0 & 5 & 0 & 0 \\
0 & 7 & 0 & 0 & 0 \\
-1 & 0 & 0 & 0 & 0
\end{bmatrix}.$$

Another example is
$$\begin{bmatrix}
0 & 0 & 0 & 0 & 1 \\
0 & 0 & 0 & 1 & 0 \\
0 & 0 & 1 & 0 & 0 \\
0 & 1 & 0 & 0 & 0 \\
1 & 0 & 0 & 0 & 0
\end{bmatrix},$$
which can be used to reverse the elements of an array (as a column matrix) by multiplying on the left.

== Properties ==
All anti-diagonal matrices are also persymmetric.

The product of two anti-diagonal matrices is a diagonal matrix. Furthermore, the product of an anti-diagonal matrix with a diagonal matrix is anti-diagonal, as is the product of a diagonal matrix with an anti-diagonal matrix.

An anti-diagonal matrix is invertible if and only if the entries on the diagonal from the lower left corner to the upper right corner are nonzero. The inverse of an invertible anti-diagonal matrix is also anti-diagonal, as can be seen from the paragraph above. The determinant of an anti-diagonal matrix has absolute value given by the product of the entries on the diagonal from the lower left corner to the upper right corner. However, the sign of this determinant varies because the one nonzero signed elementary product from an anti-diagonal matrix has a different sign depending on whether the permutation related to it is odd or even:

Matrix size	Permutation for nonzero elementary product of anti-diagonal matrix	Even or odd	Sign of elementary product
2 × 2	{2, 1}	Odd	−
3 × 3	{3, 2, 1}	Odd	−
4 × 4	{4, 3, 2, 1}	Even	+
5 × 5	{5, 4, 3, 2, 1}	Even	+
6 × 6	{6, 5, 4, 3, 2, 1}	Odd	−

More precisely, the sign of the elementary product needed to calculate the determinant of an anti-diagonal matrix is related to whether the corresponding triangular number is even or odd. This is because the number of inversions in the permutation for the only nonzero signed elementary product of an n × n anti-diagonal matrix is equal to the nth such number.

== See also ==
- Main diagonal, all off-diagonal elements are zero in a diagonal matrix.
- Exchange matrix, an anti-diagonal matrix with 1s along the counter-diagonal.
