= Arrowhead matrix =

In the mathematical field of linear algebra, an arrowhead matrix is a square matrix containing zeros in all entries except for the first row, first column, and main diagonal, these entries can be any number. In other words, the matrix has the form

$$A=\begin{bmatrix}
\,\! *&*&*&*&* \\
\,\! *&*&0&0&0 \\
\,\! *&0&*&0&0 \\
\,\! *&0&0&*&0 \\
\,\! *&0&0&0&*
\end{bmatrix}.$$

Any symmetric permutation of the arrowhead matrix, $P^T A P$, where P is a permutation matrix, is a (permuted) arrowhead matrix. Real symmetric arrowhead matrices are used in some algorithms for finding of eigenvalues and eigenvectors.

== Real symmetric arrowhead matrices ==
Let A be a real symmetric (permuted) arrowhead matrix of the form

$$A = \begin{bmatrix}
D & z \\
z^{T} & \alpha
\end{bmatrix},$$

where $D=\mathop{\mathrm{diag}}(d_{1},d_{2},\ldots ,d_{n-1})$ is diagonal matrix of order n−1,
$$z=\begin{bmatrix}
\zeta _{1} & \zeta _{2} & \cdots & \zeta _{n-1}
\end{bmatrix}^T$$
is a vector and $\alpha$ is a scalar. Note that here the arrow is pointing to the bottom right.

Let

$$A=V\Lambda V^{T}$$

be the eigenvalue decomposition of A, where $\Lambda = \operatorname{diag}(\lambda_1,\lambda_2,\ldots ,\lambda_n)$ is a diagonal matrix whose diagonal elements are the eigenvalues of A, and
$$V = \begin{bmatrix} v_{1} & \cdots & v_{n} \end{bmatrix}$$
is an orthonormal matrix whose columns are the corresponding eigenvectors. The following holds:

- If $\zeta_i=0$ for some i, then the pair $(d_i,e_i)$, where $e_i$ is the i-th standard basis vector, is an eigenpair of A. Thus, all such rows and columns can be deleted, leaving the matrix with all $\zeta_i\neq 0$.
- The Cauchy interlacing theorem implies that the sorted eigenvalues of A interlace the sorted elements $d_i$: if $d_1 \geq d_2\geq \cdots\geq d_{n-1}$ (this can be attained by symmetric permutation of rows and columns without loss of generality), and if $\lambda_i$s are sorted accordingly, then $\lambda_1\geq d_1\geq \lambda_2\geq d_2\geq \cdots \geq \lambda_{n-1} \geq d_{n-1} \geq \lambda_n$.
- If $d_i=d_j$, for some $i\neq j$, the above inequality implies that $d_{i}$ is an eigenvalue of A. The size of the problem can be reduced by annihilating $\zeta_j$ with a Givens rotation in the $(i,j)$-plane and proceeding as above.

Symmetric arrowhead matrices arise in descriptions of radiationless transitions in isolated molecules and oscillators vibrationally coupled with a Fermi liquid.

== Eigenvalues and eigenvectors ==
A symmetric arrowhead matrix is irreducible if $\zeta_i\neq 0$ for all i and $d_{i}\neq d_{j}$ for all $i\neq j$. The eigenvalues of an irreducible real symmetric arrowhead matrix are the zeros of the secular equation

$$f(\lambda )=\alpha -\lambda -\sum_{i=1}^{n-1}\frac{\zeta _{i}^{2}}{
d_{i}-\lambda }\equiv \alpha -\lambda -z^{T}(D-\lambda I)^{-1}z=0$$

which can be, for example, computed by the bisection method. The corresponding eigenvectors are equal to

$$v_{i}=\frac{x_{i}}{\| x_{i}\| _{2}}, \quad x_{i}=
\begin{bmatrix}
\left( D-\lambda _{i}I\right)^{-1}z \\
-1
\end{bmatrix}, \quad i=1,\ldots ,n.$$

Direct application of the above formula may yield eigenvectors which are not numerically sufficiently orthogonal. The forward stable algorithm which computes each eigenvalue and each component of the corresponding eigenvector to almost full accuracy is described in.

== Inverses ==
Let A be an irreducible real symmetric (permuted) arrowhead matrix of the form

$$A = \begin{bmatrix}
D & z \\
z^{T} & \alpha
\end{bmatrix}.$$

If $d_i\neq 0$ for all i, the inverse is a rank-one modification of a diagonal matrix (diagonal-plus-rank-one matrix or DPR1):

$$A^{-1}=\begin{bmatrix} D^{-1} &  \\ & 0\end{bmatrix}+\rho uu^{T},$$

where

$$u=\begin{bmatrix} D^{-1} z \\ -1\end{bmatrix},\quad \rho =\frac{1}{\alpha-z^{T}D^{-1}z}.$$

If $d_i=0$ for some i, the inverse is a permuted irreducible real symmetric arrowhead matrix:

$$A^{-1}=\begin{bmatrix}
D_{1}^{-1} & w_{1} & 0 & 0 \\
w_{1}^{T} & b & w_{2}^{T} & 1/\zeta _{i} \\
0 & w_{2} & D_{2}^{-1} & 0 \\
0 & 1/\zeta _{i} & 0 & 0
\end{bmatrix}$$

where

$$\begin{alignat}{2}
D_1& =\mathop{\mathrm{diag}}(d_{1},d_{2},\ldots ,d_{i-1}), \\
D_2&=\mathop{\mathrm{diag}}(d_{i+1},d_{i+2},\ldots ,d_{n-1}),\\
z_1&=\begin{bmatrix} \zeta _{1} & \zeta _{2} & \cdots & \zeta _{i-1}\end{bmatrix}^T, \\
z_2&=\begin{bmatrix} \zeta _{i+1} & \zeta _{i+2} & \cdots & \zeta _{n-1}\end{bmatrix}^T,\\
w_{1}&=-D_{1}^{-1}z_{1}\frac{1}{\zeta _{i}},\\
w_{2}&=-D_{2}^{-1}z_{2}\frac{1}{\zeta _{i}},\\
b&=\frac{1}{\zeta _{i}^{2}}\left(
-a+z_{1}^{T}D_{1}^{-1}z_{1}+z_{2}^{T}D_{2}^{-1}z_{2}\right).
\end{alignat}$$
