= Transpositions matrix =

Transpositions matrix (Tr matrix) is square $n \times n$ matrix, $n=2^{m}$, $m \in N$, which elements are obtained from the elements of given n-dimensional vector $X=(x_i)_{\begin{smallmatrix} i={1,n} \end{smallmatrix}}$ as follows: $Tr_{i,j} = x_{(i-1) \oplus (j-1)+1}$, where $\oplus$ denotes operation "bitwise Exclusive or" (XOR). The rows and columns of Transpositions matrix consists permutation of elements of vector X, as there are n/2 transpositions between every two rows or columns of the matrix

== Example ==
The figure below shows Transpositions matrix $Tr(X)$ of order 8, created from arbitrary vector
$$X=\begin{pmatrix}x_1,x_2,x_3,x_4,x_5,x_6,x_7,x_8 \\\end{pmatrix}$$
$$Tr(X) =
\left[\begin{array} {cccc|ccccc}
x_1 & x_2 & x_3 & x_4 & x_5 & x_6 & x_7 & x_8 \\
x_2 & x_1 & x_4 & x_3 & x_6 & x_5 & x_8 & x_7 \\
x_3 & x_4 & x_1 & x_2 & x_7 & x_8 & x_5 & x_6 \\
x_4 & x_3 & x_2 & x_1 & x_8 & x_7 & x_6 & x_5 \\
\hline
x_5 & x_6 & x_7 & x_8 & x_1 & x_2 & x_3 & x_4 \\
x_6 & x_5 & x_8 & x_7 & x_2 & x_1 & x_4 & x_3 \\
x_7 & x_8 & x_5 & x_6 & x_3 & x_4 & x_1 & x_2 \\
x_8 & x_7 & x_6 & x_5 & x_4 & x_3 & x_2 & x_1
\end{array}\right]$$

== Properties ==
- $Tr$ matrix is symmetric matrix.
- $Tr$ matrix is persymmetric matrix, i.e. it is symmetric with respect to the northeast-to-southwest diagonal too.
- Every one row and column of $Tr$ matrix consists all n elements of given vector $X$ without repetition.
- Every two rows $Tr$ matrix consists $n/2$ fours of elements with the same values of the diagonal elements. In example if $Tr_{p,q}$ and $Tr_{u,q}$ are two arbitrary selected elements from the same column q of $Tr$ matrix, then, $Tr$ matrix consists one fours of elements $( Tr_{p,q}, Tr_{u,q}, Tr_{p,v}, Tr_{u,v})$, for which are satisfied the equations $Tr_{p,q}=Tr_{u,v}$ and $Tr_{u,q} = Tr_{p,v}$. This property, named “Tr-property” is specific to $Tr$ matrices.

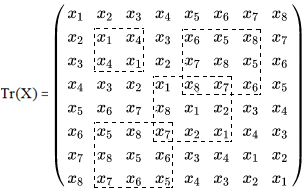
Fours of elements in Tr matrix

The figure on the right shows some fours of elements in $Tr$ matrix.

== Transpositions matrix with mutually orthogonal rows (Trs matrix) ==
The property of fours of $Tr$ matrices gives the possibility to create matrix with mutually orthogonal rows and columns ($Trs$ matrix ) by changing the sign to an odd number of elements in every one of fours $( Tr_{p,q}, Tr_{u,q}, Tr_{p,v}, Tr_{u,v})$, $p,q,u,v \in [1,n]$. In [5] is offered algorithm for creating $Trs$ matrix using Hadamard product, (denoted by $\circ$) of Tr matrix and n-dimensional Hadamard matrix whose rows (except the first one) are rearranged relative to the rows of Sylvester-Hadamard matrix in order $R=[1, r_2, \dots, r_n]^T , r_2, \dots, r_n \in [2,n]$, for which the rows of the resulting Trs matrix are mutually orthogonal.

$$Trs(X) = Tr(X)\circ H(R)$$
$$Trs.{Trs}^T=\parallel X\parallel^2.I_n$$

where:

- "$\circ$" denotes operation Hadamard product
- $I_n$ is n-dimensional Identity matrix.
- $H(R)$ is n-dimensional Hadamard matrix, which rows are interchanged against the Sylvester-Hadamard[4] matrix in given order $R=[1, r_2, \dots, r_n]^T , r_2, \dots, r_n \in [2,n]$ for which the rows of the resulting $Trs$ matrix are mutually orthogonal.
- $X$ is the vector from which the elements of $Tr$ matrix are derived.

Orderings R of Hadamard matrix’s rows were obtained experimentally for $Trs$ matrices of sizes 2, 4 and 8. The ordering R of Hadamard matrix’s rows (against the Sylvester-Hadamard matrix) does not depend on the vector $X$. Has been proven[5] that, if $X$ is unit vector (i.e. $\parallel X\parallel=1$), then $Trs$ matrix (obtained as it was described above) is matrix of reflection.

== Example of obtaining Trs matrix ==
Transpositions matrix with mutually orthogonal rows ($Trs$ matrix) of order 4 for vector
$$X = \begin{pmatrix} x_1, x_2, x_3, x_4 \end{pmatrix}^T$$
is obtained as:

$$Trs(X) = H(R) \circ Tr(X) =
\begin{pmatrix}
1 & 1 & 1 & 1 \\
1 &-1 & 1 &-1 \\
1 &-1 &-1 & 1 \\
1 & 1 &-1 &-1 \\
\end{pmatrix}\circ
\begin{pmatrix}
x_1 & x_2 & x_3 & x_4 \\
x_2 & x_1 & x_4 & x_3 \\
x_3 & x_4 & x_1 & x_2 \\
x_4 & x_3 & x_2 & x_1 \\
\end{pmatrix}=
\begin{pmatrix}
x_1 & x_2 & x_3 & x_4 \\
x_2 &-x_1 & x_4 &-x_3 \\
x_3 &-x_4 &-x_1 & x_2 \\
x_4 & x_3 &-x_2 &-x_1 \\
\end{pmatrix}$$
where $Tr(X)$ is $Tr$ matrix, obtained from vector $X$, and "$\circ$" denotes operation Hadamard product and $H(R)$ is Hadamard matrix, which rows are interchanged in given order $R$ for which the rows of the resulting $Trs$ matrix are mutually orthogonal. As can be seen from the figure above, the first row of the resulting $Trs$ matrix contains the elements of the vector $X$ without transpositions and sign change. Taking into consideration that the rows of the $Trs$ matrix are mutually orthogonal, we get
$$Trs(X).X = \left\| X \right\|^2 \begin{bmatrix}1 \\ 0 \\ 0 \\ 0\end{bmatrix}$$

which means that the $Trs$ matrix rotates the vector $X$, from which it is derived, in the direction of the coordinate axis $x_1$

In [5] are given as examples code of a Matlab functions that creates $Tr$ and $Trs$ matrices for vector $X$ of size n = 2, 4, or, 8. Stay open question is it possible to create $Trs$ matrices of size, greater than 8.

== See also ==
- Symmetric matrix
- Persymmetric matrix
- Orthogonal matrix
