= Bidiagonal matrix =

Matrix with two nonzero diagonals

In mathematics, a bidiagonal matrix is a banded matrix with non-zero entries along the main diagonal and either the diagonal above or the diagonal below. This means there are exactly two non-zero diagonals in the matrix.

When the diagonal above the main diagonal has the non-zero entries the matrix is upper bidiagonal. When the diagonal below the main diagonal has the non-zero entries the matrix is lower bidiagonal.

For example, the following matrix is upper bidiagonal:
$$\begin{pmatrix}
1 & 4 & 0 & 0 \\
0 & 4 & 1 & 0 \\
0 & 0 & 3 & 4 \\
0 & 0 & 0 & 3 \\
\end{pmatrix}$$

and the following matrix is lower bidiagonal:

$$\begin{pmatrix}
1 & 0 & 0 & 0 \\
2 & 4 & 0 & 0 \\
0 & 3 & 3 & 0 \\
0 & 0 & 4 & 3 \\
\end{pmatrix}.$$

The eigenvalues of a bidiagonal matrix (of either type) are given by the entries of the diagonal.

For a square bidiagonal matrix B, the determinant is simply the product of its diagonal elements:

$\det(B) = \prod_{i=1}^{n} b_{ii}$

Additionally, the inverse of a nonsingular upper bidiagonal matrix B is an upper triangular matrix whose entries can be computed explicitly without solving full systems of linear equations.

== Usage ==
One variant of the QR algorithm starts with reducing a general matrix into a bidiagonal one, and the singular value decomposition (SVD) uses this method as well.

=== Singular Value Decomposition ===
Reducing a matrix to bidiagonal form is a standard first step in the Golub-Kahan algorithm for computing the SVD. Because Householder reflections or Given rotations can reduce a dense $m\times n$ matrix to an equivalent bidiagonal matrix in $\mathcal{O}(m\times n^2)$ operations, working with the bidiagonal structure drastically reduces the computational cost of subsequent iterative SVD and QR steps.

=== High Relative Accuracy in Ill-Conditioned Systems ===
For general dense matrices, standard numerical algorithms compute singular values with an absolute error bound proportional to the largest singular value. If the matrix is ill-conditioned, this can result in a total loss of precision for the smallest singular values.

Because of this, specialized algorithms such as the zero-shift bidiagonal QR algorithm or the differential qd (dqd) algorithm developed by James Demmel and William Kahan can compute all the singular values of a bidiagonal matrix to high relative accuracy, regardless of the matrix's condition number.

== See also ==
- List of matrices
- Singular value decomposition
- Lanczos algorithm
- LAPACK
- Hessenberg form — The Hessenberg form is similar, but has more non-zero diagonal lines than 2.
