= Nilpotent matrix =

Mathematical concept in algebra

In linear algebra, a nilpotent matrix is a square matrix N such that

$$N^k = 0\,$$

for some positive integer $k$. The smallest such $k$ is called the index of $N$, sometimes the degree of $N$.

More generally, a nilpotent transformation is a linear transformation $L$ of a vector space such that $L^k = 0$ for some positive integer $k$ (and thus, $L^j = 0$ for all $j \geq k$). Both of these concepts are special cases of a more general concept of nilpotence that applies to elements of rings.

== Examples ==
=== Example 1 ===
The matrix

$$A = \begin{bmatrix}
0 & 1 \\
0 & 0
\end{bmatrix}$$

is nilpotent with index 2, since $A^2 = 0$.

=== Example 2 ===
More generally, any $n$-dimensional triangular matrix with zeros along the main diagonal is nilpotent, with index $\le n$. For example, the matrix

$$B=\begin{bmatrix}
0 & 2 & 1 & 6\\
0 & 0 & 1 & 2\\
0 & 0 & 0 & 3\\
0 & 0 & 0 & 0
\end{bmatrix}$$

is nilpotent, with

$$B^2=\begin{bmatrix}
0 & 0 & 2 & 7\\
0 & 0 & 0 & 3\\
0 & 0 & 0 & 0\\
0 & 0 & 0 & 0
\end{bmatrix}
;\
B^3=\begin{bmatrix}
0 & 0 & 0 & 6\\
0 & 0 & 0 & 0\\
0 & 0 & 0 & 0\\
0 & 0 & 0 & 0
\end{bmatrix}
;\
B^4=\begin{bmatrix}
0 & 0 & 0 & 0\\
0 & 0 & 0 & 0\\
0 & 0 & 0 & 0\\
0 & 0 & 0 & 0
\end{bmatrix}$$

The index of $B$ is therefore 4.

=== Example 3 ===
Although the examples above have a large number of zero entries, a typical nilpotent matrix does not. For example,

$$C=\begin{bmatrix}
5 & -3 & 2 \\
15 & -9 & 6 \\
10 & -6 & 4
\end{bmatrix}
\qquad
C^2=\begin{bmatrix}
0 & 0 & 0 \\
0 & 0 & 0 \\
0 & 0 & 0
\end{bmatrix}$$

although the matrix has no zero entries.

=== Example 4 ===
Additionally, any matrices of the form

$$\begin{bmatrix}
a_1 & a_1 & \cdots & a_1 \\
a_2 & a_2 & \cdots & a_2 \\
\vdots & \vdots & \ddots & \vdots \\
-a_1-a_2-\ldots-a_{n-1} & -a_1-a_2-\ldots-a_{n-1} & \ldots & -a_1-a_2-\ldots-a_{n-1}
\end{bmatrix}$$

such as

$$\begin{bmatrix}
5 & 5 & 5 \\
6 & 6 & 6 \\
-11 & -11 & -11
\end{bmatrix}$$

or

$$\begin{bmatrix}
1 & 1 & 1 & 1 \\
2 & 2 & 2 & 2 \\
4 & 4 & 4 & 4 \\
-7 & -7 & -7 & -7
\end{bmatrix}$$

square to zero.

=== Example 5 ===
Perhaps some of the most striking examples of nilpotent matrices are $n\times n$ square matrices of the form:

$$\begin{bmatrix}
2 & 2 & 2 & \cdots & 1-n \\
n+2 & 1 & 1 & \cdots & -n \\
1 & n+2 & 1 & \cdots & -n \\
1 & 1 & n+2 & \cdots & -n \\
\vdots & \vdots & \vdots & \ddots & \vdots
\end{bmatrix}$$

The first few of which are:

$$\begin{bmatrix}
2 & -1 \\
4 & -2
\end{bmatrix}
\qquad
\begin{bmatrix}
2 & 2 & -2 \\
5 & 1 & -3 \\
1 & 5 & -3
\end{bmatrix}
\qquad
\begin{bmatrix}
2 & 2 & 2 & -3 \\
6 & 1 & 1 & -4 \\
1 & 6 & 1 & -4 \\
1 & 1 & 6 & -4
\end{bmatrix}
\qquad
\begin{bmatrix}
2 & 2 & 2 & 2 & -4 \\
7 & 1 & 1 & 1 & -5 \\
1 & 7 & 1 & 1 & -5 \\
1 & 1 & 7 & 1 & -5 \\
1 & 1 & 1 & 7 & -5
\end{bmatrix}
\qquad
\ldots$$

These matrices are nilpotent but there are no zero entries in any powers of them less than the index.

=== Example 6 ===
Consider the linear space of polynomials of a bounded degree. The derivative operator is a linear map. We know that applying the derivative to a polynomial decreases its degree by one, so when applying it iteratively, we will eventually obtain zero. Therefore, on such a space, the derivative is representable by a nilpotent matrix.

== Characterization ==
For an $n \times n$ square matrix $N$ with real (or complex) entries, the following are equivalent:

- $N$ is nilpotent.
- The characteristic polynomial for $N$ is $\det \left(xI - N\right) = x^n$.
- The minimal polynomial for $N$ is $x^k$ for some positive integer $k \leq n$.
- The only complex eigenvalue for $N$ is 0, i.e., the spectrum of $N$ is $\{0\}$.

The last theorem holds true for matrices over any field of characteristic 0 or sufficiently large characteristic. (cf. Newton's identities)

This theorem has several consequences, including:

- The index of an $n \times n$ nilpotent matrix is always less than or equal to $n$. For example, every $2 \times 2$ nilpotent matrix squares to zero.
- The determinant and trace of a nilpotent matrix are always zero. Consequently, a nilpotent matrix cannot be invertible.
- The only nilpotent diagonalizable matrix is the zero matrix.

See also: Jordan–Chevalley decomposition#Nilpotency criterion.

== Classification ==
Consider the $n \times n$ (upper) shift matrix:

$$S = \begin{bmatrix}
0 & 1 & 0 & \ldots & 0  \\
0 & 0 & 1 & \ldots & 0  \\
\vdots & \vdots & \vdots & \ddots & \vdots \\
0 & 0 & 0 & \ldots & 1  \\
0 & 0 & 0 & \ldots & 0
\end{bmatrix}.$$

This matrix has 1s along the superdiagonal and 0s everywhere else. As a linear transformation, the shift matrix "shifts" the components of a vector one position to the left, with a zero appearing in the last position:

$S(x_1,x_2,\ldots,x_n) = (x_2,\ldots,x_n,0).$

This matrix is nilpotent with degree $n$, and is the canonical nilpotent matrix.

Specifically, if $N$ is any nilpotent matrix, then $N$ is similar to a block diagonal matrix of the form

$$\begin{bmatrix}
S_1 & 0 & \ldots & 0 \\
0 & S_2 & \ldots & 0 \\
\vdots & \vdots & \ddots & \vdots \\
0 & 0 & \ldots & S_r
\end{bmatrix}$$

where each of the blocks $S_1,S_2,\ldots,S_r$ is a shift matrix (possibly of different sizes). This form is a special case of the Jordan canonical form for matrices.

For example, any nonzero 2 × 2 nilpotent matrix is similar to the matrix

$$\begin{bmatrix}
0 & 1 \\
0 & 0
\end{bmatrix}.$$

That is, if $N$ is any nonzero 2 × 2 nilpotent matrix, then there exists a basis b_{1}, b_{2} such that Nb_{1} = 0 and Nb_{2} = b_{1}.

This classification theorem holds for matrices over any field. (It is not necessary for the field to be algebraically closed.)

== Flag of subspaces ==
A nilpotent transformation $L$ on $\mathbb{R}^n$ naturally determines a flag of subspaces

$$\{0\} \subset \ker L \subset \ker L^2 \subset \ldots \subset \ker L^{q-1} \subset \ker L^q = \mathbb{R}^n$$

and a signature

$$0 = n_0 < n_1 < n_2 < \ldots < n_{q-1} < n_q = n,\qquad n_i = \dim \ker L^i.$$

The signature characterizes $L$ up to an invertible linear transformation. Furthermore, it satisfies the inequalities

$$n_{j+1} - n_j \leq n_j - n_{j-1}, \qquad \mbox{for all } j = 1,\ldots,q-1.$$

Conversely, any sequence of natural numbers satisfying these inequalities is the signature of a nilpotent transformation.

== Additional properties ==
- If $N$ is nilpotent of index $k$ , then $I+N$ and $I-N$ are invertible, where $I$ is the $n \times n$ identity matrix. The inverses are given by
  $$\begin{align}
(I + N)^{-1} &= \displaystyle\sum^k_{m=0}\left(-N\right)^m = I - N + N^2 - N^3 + N^4 - N^5 + N^6 - N^7 + \cdots +(-N)^k \\
(I - N)^{-1} &= \displaystyle\sum^k_{m=0}N^m = I + N + N^2 + N^3 + N^4 + N^5 + N^6 + N^7 +  \cdots + N^k \\
\end{align}$$
- If $N$ is nilpotent, then
  $$\det (I + N) = 1.$$
  Conversely, if $A$ is a matrix and
  $$\det (I + tA) = 1\!\,$$
  for all values of $t$, then $A$ is nilpotent. In fact, since $p(t) = \det (I + tA) - 1$ is a polynomial of degree $n$, it suffices to have this hold for $n+1$ distinct values of $t$.
- Every singular matrix can be written as a product of nilpotent matrices.
- A nilpotent matrix is a special case of a convergent matrix.

== Generalizations ==
A linear operator $T$ is locally nilpotent if for every vector $v$, there exists a $k\in\mathbb{N}$ such that

$$T^k(v) = 0.\!\,$$

For operators on a finite-dimensional vector space, local nilpotence is equivalent to nilpotence.
