= Matrix of ones =

Matrix with every entry equal to one

In mathematics, a matrix of ones or all-ones matrix is a matrix with every entry equal to one. For example:

$$J_2 = \begin{bmatrix}
1 & 1 \\
1 & 1
\end{bmatrix},\quad
J_3 = \begin{bmatrix}
1 & 1 & 1 \\
1 & 1 & 1 \\
1 & 1 & 1
\end{bmatrix},\quad
J_{2,5} = \begin{bmatrix}
1 & 1 & 1 & 1 & 1 \\
1 & 1 & 1 & 1 & 1
\end{bmatrix},\quad
J_{1,2} = \begin{bmatrix}
1 & 1
\end{bmatrix}.\quad$$

Some sources call the all-ones matrix the unit matrix, but that term may also refer to the identity matrix, a different type of matrix.

A vector of ones or all-ones vector is matrix of ones having row or column form; it should not be confused with unit vectors.

== Properties ==
For an n × n matrix of ones J, the following properties hold:

- The trace of J equals n, and the determinant equals 0 for n ≥ 2, but equals 1 if n = 1.
- The characteristic polynomial of J is $(x - n)x^{n-1}$.
- The minimal polynomial of J is $x^2-nx$.
- The rank of J is 1 and the eigenvalues are n with multiplicity 1 and 0 with multiplicity n − 1.
- $J^k = n^{k-1} J$ for $k = 1,2,\ldots .$
- J is the neutral element of the Hadamard product.

When J is considered as a matrix over the real numbers, the following additional properties hold:

- J is positive semi-definite matrix.
- The matrix $\tfrac1n J$ is idempotent.
- The matrix exponential of J is $\exp(\mu J)=I+\frac{e^{\mu n}-1}{n}J$

== Applications ==
The all-ones matrix arises in the mathematical field of combinatorics, particularly involving the application of algebraic methods to graph theory. For example, if A is the adjacency matrix of an n-vertex undirected graph G, and J is the all-ones matrix of the same dimension, then G is a regular graph if and only if AJ = JA. As a second example, the matrix appears in some linear-algebraic proofs of Cayley's formula, which gives the number of spanning trees of a complete graph, using the matrix tree theorem.

The logical square roots of a matrix of ones, logical matrices whose square is a matrix of ones, can be used to characterize the central groupoids. Central groupoids are algebraic structures that obey the identity $(a\cdot b)\cdot (b\cdot c)=b$. Finite central groupoids have a square number of elements, and the corresponding logical matrices exist only for those dimensions.

== See also ==
- Zero matrix, a matrix where all entries are zero
- Single-entry matrix
