= Wilson matrix =

Mathematical structure used in graph theory

Wilson matrix is the following $4\times 4$ matrix having integers as elements:

$$W = \begin{bmatrix}5&7&6&5 \\ 7&10&8&7 \\ 6&8&10&9 \\ 5&7&9&10\end{bmatrix}$$

This is the coefficient matrix of the following system of linear equations considered in a paper by J. Morris published in 1946:

$$\text{(S1)}\quad \begin{align}
5x+7y+6z+5u & = 23\\
7x+10y+8z+7u & = 32\\
6x+8y+10z+9u&=33\\
5x+7y+9z+10u&=31
\end{align}$$

Morris ascribes the source of the set of equations to one T. S. Wilson but no details about Wilson have been provided. The particular system of equations was used by Morris to illustrate the concept of ill-conditioned system of equations. The matrix $W$ has been used as an example and for test purposes in many research papers and books over the years. John Todd has referred to $W$ as “the notorious matrix W of T. S. Wilson”.

== Properties ==
1. $W$ is a symmetric matrix.
2. $W$ is positive definite.
3. The determinant of $W$ is $1$.
4. The inverse of $W$ is
  $$W^{-1} =
\begin{bmatrix} 68 & -41 & -17 & 10\\ -41 & 25 & 10 & -6 \\ -17 & 10 & 5 &- 3 \\ 10 & -6 & -3 & 2 \end{bmatrix}$$
5. The characteristic polynomial of $W$ is $\lambda^4-35 \lambda^3+146 \lambda^2-100 \lambda+1$.
6. The eigenvalues of $W$ are $\quad 0.01015004839789187,\quad 0.8431071498550294,\quad 3.858057455944953,\quad 30.28868534580213$.
7. Since $W$ is symmetric, the $L^2$ norm condition number of $W$ is $\kappa_2(W)=\frac{max(\lambda)}{min(\lambda)}=\frac{30.28868534580213}{0.01015004839789187} = 2984.09270167549$.
8. The solution of the system of equations $(S1)$ is $x=y=z=u=1$.
9. The Cholesky factorisation of $W$ is $W= R^TR$ where
  $$R
=\begin{bmatrix} \sqrt{5} & \frac{7}{\sqrt{5}} & \frac{6}{\sqrt{5}} & \sqrt{5} \\ 0 & \frac{1}{\sqrt{5}} & -\frac{2}{\sqrt{5}} & 0 \\ 0 & 0 & \sqrt{2} & \frac{3}{\sqrt{2}} \\ 0 & 0 & 0 & \frac{1}{\sqrt{2}}\end{bmatrix}$$.
10. $W$ has the factorisation $W= LDL^T$ where
  $$L =
\begin{bmatrix}
1 & 0 & 0 & 0 \\ \frac{7}{5} & 1 & 0 & 0 \\ \frac{6}{5} & -2 & 1 & 0 \\ 1 & 0 & \frac{3}{2} & 1
\end{bmatrix},
\quad
D=\begin{bmatrix}
5 & 0 & 0 & 0 \\ 0 & \frac{1}{5} & 0 & 0 \\ 0 & 0 & 2 & 0 \\ 0 & 0 & 0 & \frac{1}{2}
\end{bmatrix}$$.
11. $W$ has the factorisation $W=Z^TZ$ with $Z$ as the integer matrix
  $$Z=
\begin{bmatrix}
2 & 3 & 2 & 2 \\ 1 & 1 & 2 & 1 \\ 0 & 0 & 1 & 2 \\ 0 & 0 & 1 & 1
\end{bmatrix}$$.

== Research problems spawned by Wilson matrix ==
A consideration of the condition number of the Wilson matrix has spawned several interesting research problems relating to condition numbers of matrices in certain special classes of matrices having some or all the special features of the Wilson matrix. In particular, the following special classes of matrices have been studied:

1. $S=$ the set of $4 \times 4$ nonsingular, symmetric matrices with integer entries between 1 and 10.
2. $P =$ the set of $4 \times 4$ positive definite, symmetric matrices with integer entries between 1 and 10.

An exhaustive computation of the condition numbers of the matrices in the above sets has yielded the following results:

1. Among the elements of $S$, the maximum condition number is $7.6119\times 10^4$ and this maximum is attained by the matrix
  $$\begin{bmatrix}
2 & 7 & 10 & 10 \\ 7 & 10 & 10 & 9 \\ 10 & 10 & 10 & 1 \\ 10 & 9 & 1 & 10
\end{bmatrix}$$.
2. Among the elements of $P$, the maximum condition number is $3.5529 \times 10^4$ and this maximum is attained by the matrix
  $$\begin{bmatrix}
9 & 1 & 1 & 5 \\ 1 & 10 & 1 & 9 \\ 1 & 1 & 10 & 1 \\  5 & 9 & 1 & 10
\end{bmatrix}$$.
