= Matrix unit =

Concept in mathematics

In linear algebra, a matrix unit is a matrix with only one nonzero entry with value 1. The matrix unit with a 1 in the ith row and jth column is denoted as $E_{ij}$. For example, the 3 by 3 matrix unit with i = 1 and j = 2 is
$$E_{12} = \begin{bmatrix}0 & 1 & 0 \\0 & 0 & 0 \\ 0 & 0 & 0 \end{bmatrix}$$
A vector unit is a standard unit vector.

A single-entry matrix generalizes the matrix unit for matrices with only one nonzero entry of any value, not necessarily of value 1.

== Properties ==
The set of m by n matrix units is a basis of the space of m by n matrices.

The product of two matrix units of the same square shape $n \times n$ satisfies the relation $E_{ij}E_{kl} = \delta_{jk}E_{il},$ where $\delta_{jk}$ is the Kronecker delta.

The group of scalar n-by-n matrices over a ring R is the centralizer of the subset of n-by-n matrix units in the set of n-by-n matrices over R.

The matrix norm (induced by the same two vector norms) of a matrix unit is equal to 1.

When multiplied by another matrix, it isolates a specific row or column in arbitrary position. For example, for any 3-by-3 matrix A:

$$E_{23}A = \left[ \begin{matrix} 0 & 0& 0 \\ a_{31} & a_{32} & a_{33} \\ 0 & 0 & 0 \end{matrix}\right].$$
$$AE_{23} = \left[ \begin{matrix} 0 & 0 & a_{12} \\ 0 & 0 & a_{22} \\ 0 & 0 & a_{32}  \end{matrix}\right].$$
