= Zero matrix =

Matrix whose entries are all 0

In mathematics, particularly linear algebra, a zero matrix or null matrix is a matrix all of whose entries are zero. It also serves as the additive identity of the additive group of $m \times n$ matrices, and is denoted by the symbol $O$ or $0$ followed by subscripts corresponding to the dimension of the matrix as the context sees fit. Some examples of zero matrices are

$$0_{1,1} = \begin{bmatrix}
0 \end{bmatrix}
,\
0_{2,2} = \begin{bmatrix}
0 & 0 \\
0 & 0 \end{bmatrix}
,\
0_{2,3} = \begin{bmatrix}
0 & 0 & 0 \\
0 & 0 & 0 \end{bmatrix}
.\$$

== Properties ==
The set of $m \times n$ matrices with entries in a ring $K$ forms a ring $K_{m,n}$. The zero matrix $0_{K_{m,n}} \,$ in $K_{m,n} \,$ is the matrix with all entries equal to $0_K \,$, where $0_K$ is the additive identity in $K$.

$$0_{K_{m,n}} = \begin{bmatrix}
0_K & 0_K & \cdots & 0_K \\
0_K & 0_K & \cdots & 0_K \\
\vdots & \vdots & \ddots  & \vdots \\
0_K & 0_K & \cdots & 0_K \end{bmatrix}_{m \times n}$$

The zero matrix is the additive identity in $K_{m,n} \,$. That is, for all $A \in K_{m,n} \,$ it satisfies the equation
$$0_{K_{m,n}}+A = A + 0_{K_{m,n}} = A.$$

There is exactly one zero matrix of any given dimension $m\times n$ with entries from a given ring, so when the context is clear, one often refers to the zero matrix. In general, the zero element of a ring is unique, and is typically denoted by 0 without any subscript indicating the parent ring. Hence the examples above represent zero matrices over any ring.

The zero matrix also represents the linear transformation which sends all the vectors to the zero vector. It is idempotent, meaning that when it is multiplied by itself, the result is itself.

The zero matrix is the only matrix whose rank is 0.

== Occurrences ==
In ordinary least squares regression, if there is a perfect fit to the data, the annihilator matrix is the zero matrix.

== See also ==
- Identity matrix – the multiplicative identity for matrices
- Matrix of ones – a matrix where all elements are one
- Nilpotent matrix
- Single-entry matrix – a matrix where all but one element is zero
