= Main diagonal =

Entries of a matrix for which the row and column indices are equal

In linear algebra, the main diagonal (sometimes principal diagonal, primary diagonal, leading diagonal, major diagonal, or good diagonal) of a matrix $A$ is the list of entries $a_{i,j}$ where $i = j$. All off-diagonal elements are zero in a diagonal matrix. The following four matrices have their main diagonals indicated by red ones:

$$\begin{bmatrix}
\color{red}{1} & 0 & 0\\
0 & \color{red}{1} & 0\\
0 & 0 & \color{red}{1}\end{bmatrix}
\qquad
\begin{bmatrix}
\color{red}{1} & 0 & 0 & 0 \\
0 & \color{red}{1} & 0 & 0 \\
0 & 0 & \color{red}{1} & 0 \end{bmatrix}
\qquad
\begin{bmatrix}
\color{red}{1} & 0 & 0 \\
0 & \color{red}{1} & 0 \\
0 & 0 & \color{red}{1} \\
0 & 0 & 0
\end{bmatrix}
\qquad
\begin{bmatrix}
\color{red}{1} & 0 & 0 & 0 \\
0 & \color{red}{1} & 0 & 0 \\
0 & 0 & \color{red}{1} & 0 \\
0 & 0 & 0 & \color{red}{1}
\end{bmatrix}$$

== Square matrices ==
For a square matrix, the diagonal (or main diagonal or principal diagonal) is the diagonal line of entries running from the top-left corner to the bottom-right corner. That is, the diagonal of a matrix consists of the elements, called diagonal entries or diagonal elements, for which the row index and the column index are equal.

For example, the identity matrix can be defined as having entries of 1 on the main diagonal and zeroes elsewhere:

$$\begin{pmatrix}
1 & 0 & 0 \\
0 & 1 & 0 \\
0 & 0 & 1
\end{pmatrix}$$

The trace of a matrix is the sum of the diagonal elements.

The top-right to bottom-left diagonal is sometimes described as the minor diagonal or antidiagonal.

The off-diagonal entries are those not on the main diagonal. A diagonal matrix is one whose off-diagonal entries are all zero.

A superdiagonal entry is one that is directly above and to the right of the main diagonal. Just as diagonal entries are those $A_{ij}$ with $j=i$, the superdiagonal entries are those with $j = i+1$. For example, the non-zero entries of the following matrix all lie in the superdiagonal:

$$\begin{pmatrix}
0 & 2 & 0 \\
0 & 0 & 3 \\
0 & 0 & 0
\end{pmatrix}$$

Likewise, a subdiagonal entry is one that is directly below and to the left of the main diagonal, that is, an entry $A_{ij}$ with $j = i - 1$. General matrix diagonals can be specified by an index $k$ measured relative to the main diagonal: the main diagonal has $k = 0$; the superdiagonal has $k = 1$; the subdiagonal has $k = -1$; and in general, the $k$-diagonal consists of the entries $A_{ij}$ with $j = i+k$.

A banded matrix is one for which its non-zero elements are restricted to a diagonal band. A tridiagonal matrix has only the main diagonal, superdiagonal, and subdiagonal entries as non-zero.

== Antidiagonal ==
The antidiagonal (sometimes counter diagonal, secondary diagonal (*), trailing diagonal, minor diagonal, off diagonal, or bad diagonal) of an order $N$ square matrix $B$ is the collection of entries $b_{i,j}$ such that $i + j = N+1$ for all $1 \leq i, j \leq N$. That is, it runs from the top right corner to the bottom left corner.

$$\begin{bmatrix}
0 & 0 & \color{red}{1}\\
0 & \color{red}{1} & 0\\
\color{red}{1} & 0 & 0\end{bmatrix}$$

(*) Secondary (as well as trailing, minor and off) diagonals very often also mean the (a.k.a. k-th) diagonals parallel to the main or principal diagonals, i.e., $A_{i,\,i\pm k}$ for some nonzero k =1, 2, 3, ... More generally and universally, the off diagonal elements of a matrix are all elements not on the main diagonal, i.e., with distinct indices i ≠ j.

== See also ==
- Trace
