= Matrix polynomial =

Polynomial with a matrix as variable

In mathematics, a matrix polynomial is a polynomial with square matrices as variables. Given an ordinary, scalar-valued polynomial

$$P(x) = \sum_{i=0}^n{ a_i x^i} =a_0  + a_1 x+ a_2 x^2 + \cdots + a_n x^n,$$

this polynomial evaluated at a matrix $A$ is

$$P(A) = \sum_{i=0}^n{ a_i A^i} =a_0 I + a_1 A + a_2 A^2 + \cdots + a_n A^n,$$

where $I$ is the identity matrix.

Note that $P(A)$ has the same dimension as $A$.

A matrix polynomial equation is an equality between two matrix polynomials, which holds for the specific matrices in question. A matrix polynomial identity is a matrix polynomial equation which holds for all matrices A in a specified matrix ring M_{n}(R).

Matrix polynomials are often demonstrated in undergraduate linear algebra classes due to their relevance in showcasing properties of linear transformations represented as matrices, most notably the Cayley–Hamilton theorem.

The determinant of a matrix polynomial with Hermitian positive-definite (semidefinite) coefficients is a polynomial with positive (nonnegative) coefficients.

== Characteristic and minimal polynomial ==
The characteristic polynomial of a matrix A is a scalar-valued polynomial, defined by $p_A(t) = \det \left(tI - A\right)$. The Cayley–Hamilton theorem states that if this polynomial is viewed as a matrix polynomial and evaluated at the matrix $A$ itself, the result is the zero matrix: $p_A(A) = 0$. A polynomial annihilates $A$ if $p(A) = 0$; $p$ is also known as an annihilating polynomial. Thus, the characteristic polynomial is a polynomial which annihilates $A$.

There is a unique monic polynomial of minimal degree which annihilates $A$; this polynomial is the minimal polynomial. Any polynomial which annihilates $A$ (such as the characteristic polynomial) is a multiple of the minimal polynomial.

It follows that given two polynomials $P$ and $Q$, we have $P(A) = Q(A)$ if and only if

$$P^{(j)}(\lambda_i) = Q^{(j)}(\lambda_i) \qquad \text{for } j = 0,\ldots,n_i-1 \text{ and } i = 1,\ldots,s,$$

where $P^{(j)}$ denotes the $j$th derivative of $P$ and $\lambda_1, \dots, \lambda_s$ are the eigenvalues of $A$ with corresponding indices $n_1, \dots, n_s$ (the index of an eigenvalue is the size of its largest Jordan block).

== Matrix geometrical series ==
Matrix polynomials can be used to sum a matrix geometrical series as one would an ordinary geometric series,

$$S=I+A+A^2+\cdots +A^n$$
$$AS=A+A^2+A^3+\cdots +A^{n+1}$$
$$(I-A)S=S-AS=I-A^{n+1}$$
$$S=(I-A)^{-1}(I-A^{n+1})$$

If $I - A$ is nonsingular one can evaluate the expression for the sum $S$.

== See also ==
- Latimer–MacDuffee theorem
- Matrix exponential
- Matrix function
