= Minimum polynomial =

Minimum polynomial can refer to:

- Minimal polynomial (field theory)
- Minimal polynomial (linear algebra)
