= Adjunct =

Adjunct may refer to:

- Adjunct (grammar), words used as modifiers
- Adjunct professor, a rank of university professor
- Adjuncts, sources of sugar used in brewing
- Adjunct therapy used to complement another main therapeutic agent, either to improve efficacy or to reduce side-effects
- The adjugate of a matrix, sometimes called the adjunct

== See also ==
- Adjunction, a possible relationship between two functors in mathematics, specifically category theory
- Adjuvant
- Adjutant is a military rank or appointment, an officer who assists a more senior officer.
