= Minimal polynomial =

Minimal polynomial can mean:

- Minimal polynomial (field theory)
- Minimal polynomial (linear algebra)
