= Jacobi's formula =

Formula for the derivative of a matrix determinant

In matrix calculus, Jacobi's formula expresses the derivative of the determinant of a matrix A in terms of the adjugate of A and the derivative of A.

If A is a differentiable map from the real numbers to n × n matrices, then

$$\frac{d}{dt} \det A(t)
= \operatorname{tr} \left (\operatorname{adj}(A(t)) \, \frac{dA(t)}{dt}\right )
= \left(\det A(t) \right) \cdot \operatorname{tr} \left (A(t)^{-1} \cdot \, \frac{dA(t)}{dt}\right )$$

where tr(X) is the trace of the matrix X and $\operatorname{adj}(X)$ is its adjugate matrix. (The latter equality only holds if A(t) is invertible.)

As a special case,

$${\partial \det(A) \over \partial A_{ij}} = \operatorname{adj}(A)_{ji} = \operatorname{adj}(A)^T_{ij}
\Longrightarrow {\partial \det(A) \over \partial A} = \operatorname{det}(A)A^{-T}\text{ if A invertible.}$$

Equivalently, if dA stands for the differential of A, the general formula is

$$d \det (A) = \operatorname{tr} (\operatorname{adj}(A) \, dA) = \det (A) \operatorname{tr} \left (A^{-1}  d A\right )$$

The formula is named after the mathematician Carl Jacobi.

== Derivation ==
=== Via matrix computation ===
Theorem. (Jacobi's formula) For any differentiable map A from the real numbers to n × n matrices,

$$d \det (A) = \operatorname{tr} (\operatorname{adj}(A) \, dA).$$

Proof. Laplace's formula for the determinant of a matrix A can be stated as

$$\det(A) = \sum_j A_{ij} \operatorname{adj}^{\rm T} (A)_{ij}.$$

Notice that the summation is performed over some arbitrary row i of the matrix.

The determinant of A can be considered to be a function of the elements of A:

$$\det(A) = F\,(A_{11}, A_{12}, \ldots , A_{21}, A_{22}, \ldots , A_{nn})$$

so that, by the chain rule, its differential is

$$d \det(A) = \sum_i \sum_j {\partial F \over \partial A_{ij}} \,dA_{ij}.$$

This summation is performed over all n×n elements of the matrix.

To find ∂F/∂A_{ij} consider that on the right hand side of Laplace's formula, the index i can be chosen at will. (In order to optimize calculations: Any other choice would eventually yield the same result, but it could be much harder). In particular, it can be chosen to match the first index of ∂ / ∂A_{ij}:

$${\partial \det(A) \over \partial A_{ij}} = {\partial \sum_k A_{ik} \operatorname{adj}^{\rm T}(A)_{ik} \over \partial A_{ij}} = \sum_k {\partial (A_{ik} \operatorname{adj}^{\rm T}(A)_{ik}) \over \partial A_{ij}}$$

Thus, by the product rule,

$${\partial \det(A) \over \partial A_{ij}} = \sum_k {\partial A_{ik} \over \partial A_{ij}} \operatorname{adj}^{\rm T}(A)_{ik} + \sum_k A_{ik} {\partial \operatorname{adj}^{\rm T}(A)_{ik} \over \partial A_{ij}}.$$

Now, if an element of a matrix A_{ij} and a cofactor adj^{T}(A)_{ik} of element A_{ik} lie on the same row (or column), then the cofactor will not be a function of A_{ij}, because the cofactor of A_{ik} is expressed in terms of elements not in its own row (nor column). Thus,

$${\partial \operatorname{adj}^{\rm T}(A)_{ik} \over \partial A_{ij}} = 0,$$

so

$${\partial \det(A) \over \partial A_{ij}} = \sum_k \operatorname{adj}^{\rm T}(A)_{ik} {\partial  A_{ik} \over \partial A_{ij}}.$$

All the elements of A are independent of each other, i.e.

$${\partial A_{ik} \over \partial A_{ij}} = \delta_{jk},$$

where δ is the Kronecker delta, so

$${\partial \det(A) \over \partial A_{ij}} = \sum_k \operatorname{adj}^{\rm T}(A)_{ik} \delta_{jk} = \operatorname{adj}^{\rm T}(A)_{ij}.$$

Therefore,

$$d(\det(A)) = \sum_i \sum_j \operatorname{adj}^{\rm T}(A)_{ij} \,d A_{ij} = \sum_j \sum_i \operatorname{adj}(A)_{ji} \,d A_{ij} = \sum_j (\operatorname{adj}(A) \,d A)_{jj} = \operatorname{tr}(\operatorname{adj}(A) \,dA).\ \square$$

=== Via chain rule ===
Lemma 1. $\det'(I)=\mathrm{tr}$, where $\det'$ is the differential of $\det$.

This equation means that the differential of $\det$, evaluated at the identity matrix, is equal to the trace. The differential $\det'(I)$ is a linear operator that maps an n × n matrix to a real number.

Proof. Using the definition of a directional derivative together with one of its basic properties for differentiable functions, we have

$$\det'(I)(T)=\nabla_T \det(I)=\lim_{\varepsilon\to0}\frac{\det(I+\varepsilon T)-\det I}{\varepsilon}$$

$\det(I+\varepsilon T)$ is a polynomial in $\varepsilon$ of order n. It is closely related to the characteristic polynomial of $T$. The constant term in that polynomial (the term with $\varepsilon = 0$) is 1, while the linear term in $\varepsilon$ is $\mathrm{tr}\ T$. Therefore the limit equals $\mathrm{tr}\ T$ which is the claim.

Lemma 2. For an invertible matrix A, we have: $\det'(A)(T)=\det A \; \mathrm{tr}(A^{-1}T)$.

Proof.
$$\begin{align} \det'(A)(T) &\equiv \lim_{\epsilon \to 0}\left ( \frac{\det(A+\epsilon\,T)-\det(A)}{\epsilon}\right ) \\ &= \det(A)\,\lim_{\epsilon \to 0}\left ( \frac{\det(I+\epsilon\,A^{-1}\,T)-\det(I)}{\epsilon}\right ) \\ &= \det(A) \; (\det'(I)(A^{-1}\,T)) \, \ = \, \det(A) \, \mathrm{tr}(A^{-1}\,T)\end{align}$$

The first line is the definition, the second line is because the determinant of the product of two square matrices is the product of their determinants, and the last step in the third line follows from Lemma 1.

==== Theorem (Jacobi's formula) ====
$$\frac{d}{dt} \det A = \mathrm{tr}\left(\mathrm{adj}\ A\frac{dA}{dt}\right)$$

Proof. If $A$ is invertible, by Lemma 2, with $T = dA/dt$

$$\frac{d}{dt} \det A = \det A \; \mathrm{tr} \left(A^{-1} \frac{dA}{dt}\right)
= \mathrm{tr} \left( \mathrm{adj}\ A \; \frac{dA}{dt} \right)$$

using the equation relating the adjugate of $A$ to $A^{-1}$. Now, the formula holds for all matrices, since the set of invertible linear matrices is dense in the space of matrices and continuity exists.

=== Via diagonalization ===
Both sides of the Jacobi formula are polynomials in the matrix coefficients of A and A'. It is therefore sufficient to verify the polynomial identity on the dense subset where the eigenvalues of A are distinct and nonzero.

If A factors differentiably as $A=BC$, then

$$\mathrm{tr}(A^{-1}A')=
\mathrm{tr}((BC)^{-1}(BC)')=
\mathrm{tr}(B^{-1}B')+
\mathrm{tr}(C^{-1}C').$$

In particular, if L is invertible, then $I=L^{-1}L$ and

$$0=\mathrm{tr}(I^{-1}I')=
\mathrm{tr}(L(L^{-1})')+
\mathrm{tr}(L^{-1}L').$$

Since A has distinct eigenvalues, there exists a differentiable complex invertible matrix L such that $A = L^{-1}DL$ and D is diagonal. Then

$$\mathrm{tr}(A^{-1}A')=
\mathrm{tr}(L(L^{-1})')+
\mathrm{tr}(D^{-1}D')+
\mathrm{tr}(L^{-1}L')=
\mathrm{tr}(D^{-1}D').$$

Let $\lambda_i$, $i=1,\ldots,n$ be the eigenvalues of A. Then

$$\left(\ln\det A\right)' =  \left(\sum_{i=1}^{n}\ln  \lambda_i \right)'  = \sum_{i=1}^n \lambda_i'/\lambda_i =
\mathrm{tr}(D^{-1}D')=
\mathrm{tr}(A^{-1}A'),$$

which is the Jacobi formula for matrices A with distinct nonzero eigenvalues.

== Corollary ==
The following is a useful relation connecting the trace to the determinant of the associated matrix exponential:

$\det e^{B} = e^{\operatorname{tr} \left(B\right)}$

This statement is clear for diagonal matrices, and a proof of the general claim follows.

For any invertible matrix $A(t)$, in the previous section "Via Chain Rule", we showed that

$$\frac{d}{dt} \det A(t) = \det A(t) \; \operatorname{tr} \left(A(t)^{-1} \, \frac{d}{dt} A(t)\right)$$

Considering $A(t) = \exp(tB)$ in this equation yields:

$$\frac{d}{dt}  \det  e^{tB} =\operatorname{tr}(B) \det e^{tB}$$

The desired result follows as the solution to this ordinary differential equation.

== Applications ==
Several forms of the formula underlie the Faddeev–LeVerrier algorithm for computing the characteristic polynomial, and explicit applications of the Cayley–Hamilton theorem. For example, starting from the following equation, which was proved above:

$$\frac{d}{dt} \det A(t) = \det A(t) \ \operatorname{tr} \left(A(t)^{-1} \, \frac{d}{dt} A(t)\right)$$

and using $A(t) = t I - B$, we get:

$$\frac{d}{dt} \det (tI-B) = \det (tI-B) \operatorname{tr}[(tI-B)^{-1}] = \operatorname{tr}[\operatorname{adj} (tI-B)]$$

where adj denotes the adjugate matrix.

Another application is in general relativity, where one needs to evaluate the contraction of the Christoffel symbols, which are the metric-compatible torsion-free connection coefficients $\Gamma^{\mu}_{\mu\,\nu}$ where, using the Einstein summation convention, the index $\mu$ is to be summed over $\mu=0\text{,}\,1\text{,}\,2\text{,}\,3$. They are given by
$$\Gamma^{\rho}_{\mu\,\nu} = \frac{1}{2}\,g^{\rho\,\lambda}\,\left (\part_{\mu}g_{\lambda \nu}+\part_{\nu}g_{\mu \lambda}-\part_{\lambda}g_{\mu \nu} \right )$$
Here $\part_{\mu}$ is shorthand for $\frac{\part}{\part x^{\mu}}$ and $g_{\mu\nu}$ is the $4 \times 4$ symmetric non-degenerate metric tensor which has the inverse $g^{\mu\nu}$, which is also symmetric. Doing the contraction gives
$$\Gamma^{\mu}_{\mu\,\nu}=\frac{1}{2} \, g^{\lambda\mu} \, \part_{\nu}g_{\mu \lambda}$$
Let $G$ represent the matrix $g_{\mu\lambda}$. Then this can be rewritten as

$$\Gamma^{\mu}_{\mu\,\nu}=\frac{1}{2} \text{tr} \left ( G^{-1}\,\part_{\nu} G\right )$$
Let $g$ denote the determinant $|G|$. From Jacobi's formula, it follows that
$$\Gamma^{\mu}_{\mu\,\nu} = \frac{1}{2}\,\frac{1}{g} \frac{\part\,g}{\part x^{\nu}} \, =\, \frac{1}{\sqrt {|g|}} \frac{\part\,\sqrt {|g|}}{\part x^{\nu}}$$
This is the needed result.
