= Adjoint =

In mathematics, the term adjoint applies in several situations. Several of these share a similar formalism: if A is adjoint to B, then there is typically some formula of the type

(Ax, y) = (x, By).

Specifically, adjoint or adjunction may mean:

- Adjoint of a linear map, also called its transpose in case of matrices
- Hermitian adjoint (adjoint of a linear operator) in functional analysis
- Adjoint endomorphism of a Lie algebra
- Adjoint representation of a Lie group
- Adjoint functors in category theory
- Adjunction (field theory)
- Adjunction formula (algebraic geometry)
- Adjunction space in topology
- Conjugate transpose of a matrix in linear algebra
- Adjugate matrix, related to its inverse
- Adjoint equation
- The upper and lower adjoints of a Galois connection in order theory
- The adjoint of a differential operator with general polynomial coefficients
- Kleisli adjunction
- Monoidal adjunction
- Quillen adjunction
- Axiom of adjunction in set theory
- Adjunction (rule of inference)
