= Compound matrix =

Matrix whose entries are all minors of another matrix

In linear algebra, a branch of mathematics, a (multiplicative) compound matrix is a matrix whose entries are all minors, of a given size, of another matrix. Compound matrices are closely related to exterior algebras, and their computation appears in a wide array of problems, such as in the analysis of nonlinear time-varying dynamical systems and generalizations of positive systems, cooperative systems and contracting systems.

== Definition ==
Let A be an m × n matrix with real or complex entries. (Note: The definition, and the purely algebraic part of the theory, of compound matrices requires only that the matrix have entries in a commutative ring. In this case, the matrix corresponds to a homomorphism of finitely generated free modules.) If I is a subset of size r of {1, ..., m} and J is a subset of size s of {1, ..., n}, then the (I, J )-submatrix of A, written A_{I, J} , is the submatrix formed from A by retaining only those rows indexed by I and those columns indexed by J. If r = s, then det A_{I, J} is the (I, J )-minor of A.

The r th compound matrix of A is a matrix, denoted C_{r}(A), is defined as follows. If r > min(m, n), then C_{r}(A) is the unique 0 × 0 matrix. Otherwise, C_{r}(A) has size $\binom{m}{r} \!\times\! \binom{n}{r}$. Its rows and columns are indexed by r-element subsets of {1, ..., m} and {1, ..., n}, respectively, in their lexicographic order. The entry corresponding to subsets I and J is the minor det A_{I, J}.

In some applications of compound matrices, the precise ordering of the rows and columns is unimportant. For this reason, some authors do not specify how the rows and columns are to be ordered.

For example, consider the matrix

$$A = \begin{pmatrix} 1 & 2 & 3 & 4 \\ 5 & 6 & 7 & 8 \\ 9 & 10 & 11 & 12 \end{pmatrix}.$$

The rows are indexed by {1, 2, 3} and the columns by {1, 2, 3, 4}. Therefore, the rows of C_{2}(A) are indexed by the sets

$$\{1, 2\} < \{1, 3\} < \{2, 3\}$$

and the columns are indexed by

$$\{1, 2\} < \{1, 3\} < \{1, 4\} < \{2, 3\} < \{2, 4\} < \{3, 4\}.$$

Using absolute value bars to denote determinants, the second compound matrix is

$$\begin{align}
C_2(A)
&= \begin{pmatrix}
\left|\begin{smallmatrix} 1 & 2 \\ 5 & 6 \end{smallmatrix}\right| &
\left|\begin{smallmatrix} 1 & 3 \\ 5 & 7 \end{smallmatrix}\right| &
\left|\begin{smallmatrix} 1 & 4 \\ 5 & 8 \end{smallmatrix}\right| &
\left|\begin{smallmatrix} 2 & 3 \\ 6 & 7 \end{smallmatrix}\right| &
\left|\begin{smallmatrix} 2 & 4 \\ 6 & 8 \end{smallmatrix}\right| &
\left|\begin{smallmatrix} 3 & 4 \\ 7 & 8 \end{smallmatrix}\right| \\
\left|\begin{smallmatrix} 1 & 2 \\ 9 & 10 \end{smallmatrix}\right| &
\left|\begin{smallmatrix} 1 & 3 \\ 9 & 11 \end{smallmatrix}\right| &
\left|\begin{smallmatrix} 1 & 4 \\ 9 & 12 \end{smallmatrix}\right| &
\left|\begin{smallmatrix} 2 & 3 \\ 10 & 11 \end{smallmatrix}\right| &
\left|\begin{smallmatrix} 2 & 4 \\ 10 & 12 \end{smallmatrix}\right| &
\left|\begin{smallmatrix} 3 & 4 \\ 11 & 12 \end{smallmatrix}\right| \\
\left|\begin{smallmatrix} 5 & 6 \\ 9 & 10 \end{smallmatrix}\right| &
\left|\begin{smallmatrix} 5 & 7 \\ 9 & 11 \end{smallmatrix}\right| &
\left|\begin{smallmatrix} 5 & 8 \\ 9 & 12 \end{smallmatrix}\right| &
\left|\begin{smallmatrix} 6 & 7 \\ 10 & 11 \end{smallmatrix}\right| &
\left|\begin{smallmatrix} 6 & 8 \\ 10 & 12 \end{smallmatrix}\right| &
\left|\begin{smallmatrix} 7 & 8 \\ 11 & 12 \end{smallmatrix}\right|
\end{pmatrix} \\
&= \begin{pmatrix}
-4 & -8 & -12 & -4 & -8 & -4 \\
-8 & -16 & -24 & -8 & -16 & -8 \\
-4 & -8 & -12 & -4 & -8 & -4
\end{pmatrix}.
\end{align}$$

== Properties ==
Let c be a scalar, A be an m × n matrix, and B be an n × p matrix. For k a positive integer, let I_{k} denote the k × k identity matrix. The transpose of a matrix M will be written M^{T}, and the conjugate transpose by M^{*}. Then:

- C_{0}(A) = I_{1}, a 1 × 1 identity matrix.
- C_{1}(A) = A.
- C_{r}(cA) = c^{r}C_{r}(A).
- If rk A = r, then rk C_{r}(A) = 1.
- If 1 ≤ r ≤ n, then $C_r(I_n) = I_{\binom{n}{r}}$.
- If 1 ≤ r ≤ min(m, n), then C_{r}(A^{T}) = C_{r}(A)^{T}.
- If 1 ≤ r ≤ min(m, n), then C_{r}(A^{*}) = C_{r}(A)^{*}.
- C_{r}(AB) = C_{r}(A) C_{r}(B), which is closely related to Cauchy–Binet formula.

Assume in addition that A is a square matrix of size n. Then:

- C_{n}(A) = det A.
- If A has one of the following properties, then so does C_{r}(A):
  - Upper triangular,
  - Lower triangular,
  - Diagonal,
  - Orthogonal,
  - Unitary,
  - Symmetric,
  - Hermitian,
  - Skew-symmetric (when r is odd),
  - Skew-hermitian (when r is odd),
  - Positive definite,
  - Positive semi-definite,
  - Normal.
- If A is invertible, then so is C_{r}(A), and C_{r}(A^{−1}) = C_{r}(A)^{−1}.
- (Sylvester–Franke theorem) If 1 ≤ r ≤ n, then $\det C_r(A) = (\det A)^{\binom{n-1}{r-1}}$.

== Relation to exterior powers ==
Give R^{n} the standard coordinate basis e_{1}, ..., e_{n}. The r th exterior power of R^{n} is the vector space

$$\wedge^r \mathbf{R}^n$$

whose basis consists of the formal symbols

$$\mathbf{e}_{i_1} \wedge \dots \wedge \mathbf{e}_{i_r},$$

where

$$i_1 < \dots < i_r.$$

Suppose that A is an m × n matrix. Then A corresponds to a linear transformation

$$A \colon \mathbf{R}^n \to \mathbf{R}^m.$$

Taking the r th exterior power of this linear transformation determines a linear transformation

$$\wedge^r A \colon \wedge^r \mathbf{R}^n \to \wedge^r \mathbf{R}^m.$$

The matrix corresponding to this linear transformation (with respect to the above bases of the exterior powers) is C_{r}(A). Taking exterior powers is a functor, which means that

$$\wedge^r (AB) = (\wedge^r A)(\wedge^r B).$$

This corresponds to the formula C_{r}(AB) = C_{r}(A)C_{r}(B). It is closely related to, and is a strengthening of, the Cauchy–Binet formula.

== Relation to adjugate matrices ==
Let A be an n × n matrix. Recall that its r th higher adjugate matrix adj_{r}(A) is the $\binom{n}{r} \!\times\! \binom{n}{r}$ matrix whose (I, J ) entry is

$$(-1)^{\sigma(I) + \sigma(J)} \det A_{J^c, I^c},$$

where, for any set K of integers, σ(K) is the sum of the elements of K. The adjugate of A is its 1st higher adjugate and is denoted adj(A). The generalized Laplace expansion formula implies

$$C_r(A)\operatorname{adj}_r(A) = \operatorname{adj}_r(A)C_r(A) = (\det A)I_{\binom{n}{r}}.$$

If A is invertible, then

$$\operatorname{adj}_r(A^{-1}) = (\det A)^{-1}C_r(A).$$

A concrete consequence of this is Jacobi's formula for the minors of an inverse matrix:

$$\det(A^{-1})_{J^c, I^c} = (-1)^{\sigma(I) + \sigma(J)} \frac{\det A_{I,J}}{\det A}.$$

Adjugates can also be expressed in terms of compounds. Let S denote the sign matrix:

$$S = \operatorname{diag}(1, -1, 1, -1, \ldots, (-1)^{n-1}),$$

and let J denote the exchange matrix:

$$J = \begin{pmatrix} & & 1 \\ & \cdots & \\ 1 & & \end{pmatrix}.$$

Then Jacobi's theorem states that the r th higher adjugate matrix is:

$$\operatorname{adj}_r(A) = JC_{n-r}(SAS)^TJ.$$

It follows immediately from Jacobi's theorem that

$$C_r(A)\, J(C_{n-r}(SAS))^TJ = (\det A)I_{\binom{n}{r}}.$$

Taking adjugates and compounds does not commute. However, compounds of adjugates can be expressed using adjugates of compounds, and vice versa. From the identities

$$C_r(C_s(A))C_r(\operatorname{adj}_s(A)) = (\det A)^rI,$$
$$C_r(C_s(A))\operatorname{adj}_r(C_s(A)) = (\det C_s(A))I,$$

and the Sylvester-Franke theorem, we deduce

$$\operatorname{adj}_r(C_s(A)) = (\det A)^{\binom{n-1}{s-1}-r} C_r(\operatorname{adj}_s(A)).$$

The same technique leads to an additional identity,

$$\operatorname{adj}(C_r(A)) = (\det A)^{\binom{n-1}{r-1}-r} C_r(\operatorname{adj}(A)).$$

Compound and adjugate matrices appear when computing determinants of linear combinations of matrices. It is elementary to check that if A and B are n × n matrices then

$$\det(sA + tB) = C_n\!\left(\begin{bmatrix} sA & I_n \end{bmatrix}\right)C_n\!\left(\begin{bmatrix} I_n \\ tB \end{bmatrix}\right).$$

It is also true that:

$$\det(sA + tB) = \sum_{r=0}^n s^r t^{n-r} \operatorname{tr}(\operatorname{adj}_r(A)C_r(B)).$$

This has the immediate consequence

$$\det(I + A) = \sum_{r=0}^n \operatorname{tr} \operatorname{adj}_r(A) = \sum_{r=0}^n \operatorname{tr} C_r(A).$$

== Numerical computation ==
In general, the computation of compound matrices is inefficient due to its high complexity. Nonetheless, there are some efficient algorithms available for real matrices with special structure.

== Applications ==
A differential rectangle $dx_1 \times dx_2$ around $p \in R \subset \mathbb{R}^2$ is mapped by the smooth function $f$ to a surface patch in $\mathbb{R}^3$. The area of this patch is determined by the second multiplicative compound of the Jacobian of $f$, represented by the parallelogram spanned by $\frac{\partial f}{\partial x_1} dx_1$ and $\frac{\partial f}{\partial x_2} dx_2$.

Compound matrices can be used to compute the k-dimensional volume of the image of a compact set $R \subset \mathbb{R}^k$ under a smooth mapping. Let $f : \mathbb{R}^k \to \mathbb{R}^n$ be a continuously differentiable map with $n \ge k$. The volume of $f(R)$ is given by

$$\operatorname{vol}(f(R)) = \int_R \left| C_k\!\left( \left[ \frac{\partial f(x)}{\partial x_1} \;\cdots\; \frac{\partial f(x)}{\partial x_k} \right] \right) \right|\, dx.$$
