= Minor (linear algebra) =

Determinant of a subsection of a square matrix

In linear algebra, a minor of a matrix A is the determinant of some smaller square matrix generated from A by removing one or more of its rows and columns. Minors obtained by removing just one row and one column from square matrices (first minors) are useful for calculating matrix cofactors, which are useful for computing both the determinant and inverse of square matrices. The requirement that the square matrix be smaller than the original matrix is often omitted in the definition.

The cofactors $C_{ij}$ are also the partial derivatives with respect to the matrix entries of the determinant map $\text{det}:\text{Mat}(n, \mathbb R) \to \mathbb R$ which takes a matrix $(a_{i, j})_{i, j \in \{1, \dots, n\}}$ to its determinant:

$\frac{\text{d} (\text{det})}{\text{d}a_{ij}} = C_{ij}$

== Definition and illustration ==
=== First minors ===
If A is a square matrix, then the minor of the entry in the i-th row and j-th column (also called the (i, j) minor, or a first minor) is the determinant of the submatrix formed by deleting the i-th row and j-th column. This number is often denoted M_{i, j}. The (i, j) cofactor is obtained by multiplying the minor by (−1)^{i + j}, and is often denoted C_{i, j}.

To illustrate these definitions, consider the following 3 × 3 matrix,

$$\begin{bmatrix}
1 & 4 & 7 \\
3 & 0 & 5 \\
-1 & 9 & 11 \\
\end{bmatrix}$$

To compute the minor M_{2,3} and the cofactor C_{2,3}, we find the determinant of the above matrix with row 2 and column 3 removed.

$$M_{2,3} = \det \begin{bmatrix}
1    & 4    & \Box \\
\Box & \Box & \Box \\
-1   & 9    & \Box \\
\end{bmatrix}= \det \begin{bmatrix}
1 & 4 \\
-1 & 9 \\
\end{bmatrix} = 9-(-4) = 13$$

So the cofactor of the (2,3) entry is

$$C_{2,3} = (-1)^{2+3}(M_{2,3}) = -13.$$

=== General definition ===
Let A be an m × n matrix and k an integer with 0 < k ≤ m, and k ≤ n. A k × k minor of A, also called minor determinant of order k of A or, if m = n, the (n − k)th minor determinant of A (the word "determinant" is often omitted, and the word "degree" is sometimes used instead of "order") is the determinant of a k × k matrix obtained from A by deleting m − k rows and n − k columns. Sometimes the term is used to refer to the k × k matrix obtained from A as above (by deleting m − k rows and n − k columns), but this matrix should be referred to as a (square) submatrix of A, leaving the term "minor" to refer to the determinant of this matrix. For a matrix A as above, there are a total of ${m \choose k} \cdot {n \choose k}$ minors of size k × k. The minor of order zero is often defined to be 1. For a square matrix, the zeroth minor is just the determinant of the matrix.

Let
$$\begin{align}
I &= 1 \le i_1 < i_2 < \cdots < i_k \le m, \\[2pt]
J &= 1 \le j_1 < j_2 < \cdots < j_k \le n,
\end{align}$$
be ordered sequences (in natural order, as it is always assumed when talking about minors unless otherwise stated) of indexes. The minor $\det \bigl( (\mathbf A_{i_p, j_q})_{p,q = 1, \ldots, k} \bigr)$ corresponding to these choices of indexes is denoted $\det_{I,J} A$ or $\det \mathbf A_{I, J}$ or $[\mathbf A]_{I,J}$ or $M_{I,J}$ or $M_{i_1, i_2, \ldots, i_k, j_1, j_2, \ldots, j_k}$ or $M_{(i),(j)}$ (where the (i) denotes the sequence of indexes I, etc.), depending on the source. Also, there are two types of denotations in use in literature: by the minor associated to ordered sequences of indexes I and J, some authors mean the determinant of the matrix that is formed as above, by taking the elements of the original matrix from the rows whose indexes are in I and columns whose indexes are in J, whereas some other authors mean by a minor associated to I and J the determinant of the matrix formed from the original matrix by deleting the rows in I and columns in J; which notation is used should always be checked. In this article, we use the inclusive definition of choosing the elements from rows of I and columns of J. The exceptional case is the case of the first minor or the (i, j)-minor described above; in that case, the exclusive meaning $M_{i,j} = \det \bigl( \left( \mathbf A_{p,q} \right)_{p \neq i, q \neq j} \bigr)$ is standard everywhere in the literature and is used in this article also.

=== Complement ===
The complement B_{ijk..., pqr...} of a minor M_{ijk..., pqr...} of a square matrix, A, is formed by the determinant of the matrix A from which all the rows (ijk...) and columns (pqr...) associated with M_{ijk..., pqr...} have been removed. The complement of the first minor of an element a_{ij} is merely that element.

== Applications of minors and cofactors ==
=== Cofactor expansion of the determinant ===
The cofactors feature prominently in Laplace's formula for the expansion of determinants, which is a method of computing larger determinants in terms of smaller ones. Given an n × n matrix A = (a_{ij}), the determinant of A, denoted det(A), can be written as the sum of the cofactors of any row or column of the matrix multiplied by the entries that generated them. In other words, defining $C_{ij} = (-1)^{i+j} M_{ij}$ then the cofactor expansion along the j-th column gives:

$$\begin{align}
\det(\mathbf A) &= a_{1j}C_{1j} + a_{2j}C_{2j} + a_{3j}C_{3j} + \cdots + a_{nj}C_{nj} \\[2pt]
&= \sum_{i=1}^{n} a_{ij} C_{ij} \\[2pt]
&= \sum_{i=1}^{n} a_{ij}(-1)^{i+j} M_{ij}
\end{align}$$

The cofactor expansion along the i-th row gives:

$$\begin{align}
\det(\mathbf A) &= a_{i1}C_{i1} + a_{i2}C_{i2} + a_{i3}C_{i3} + \cdots + a_{in}C_{in} \\[2pt]
&= \sum_{j=1}^{n} a_{ij} C_{ij} \\[2pt]
&= \sum_{j=1}^{n} a_{ij} (-1)^{i+j} M_{ij}
\end{align}$$

=== Inverse of a matrix ===
One can write down the inverse of an invertible matrix by computing its cofactors by using Cramer's rule, as follows. The matrix formed by all of the cofactors of a square matrix A is called the cofactor matrix (also called the matrix of cofactors or, sometimes, comatrix):

$$\mathbf C = \begin{bmatrix}
C_{11}  & C_{12} & \cdots &   C_{1n} \\
C_{21}  & C_{22} & \cdots &   C_{2n} \\
\vdots & \vdots & \ddots & \vdots \\
C_{n1}  & C_{n2} & \cdots &  C_{nn}
\end{bmatrix}$$

Then the inverse of A is the transpose of the cofactor matrix times the reciprocal of the determinant of A:

$$\mathbf A^{-1} = \frac{1}{\operatorname{det}(\mathbf A)} \mathbf C^\mathsf{T}.$$

The transpose of the cofactor matrix is called the adjugate matrix (also called the classical adjoint) of A.

The above formula can be generalized as follows: Let
$$\begin{align}
I &= 1 \le i_1 < i_2 < \ldots < i_k \le n, \\[2pt]
J &= 1 \le j_1 < j_2 < \ldots < j_k \le n,
\end{align}$$
be ordered sequences (in natural order) of indexes (here A is an n × n matrix). Then

$$[\mathbf A^{-1}]_{I,J} = \pm\frac{[\mathbf A]_{J',I'}}{\det \mathbf A},$$

where I′, J′ denote the ordered sequences of indices (the indices are in natural order of magnitude, as above) complementary to I, J, so that every index 1, ..., n appears exactly once in either I or I', but not in both (similarly for the J and J') and [A]_{I, J} denotes the determinant of the submatrix of A formed by choosing the rows of the index set I and columns of index set J. Also, $[\mathbf A]_{I,J} = \det \bigl( (A_{i_p, j_q})_{p,q = 1, \ldots, k} \bigr).$ A simple proof can be given using the wedge product. Indeed,

$$\bigl[ \mathbf A^{-1} \bigr]_{I,J} (e_1\wedge\ldots \wedge e_n) = \pm(\mathbf A^{-1}e_{j_1})\wedge \ldots \wedge(\mathbf A^{-1}e_{j_k})\wedge e_{i'_1}\wedge\ldots \wedge e_{i'_{n-k}},$$

where $e_1, \ldots, e_n$ are the basis vectors. Acting by A on both sides, one gets

$$\begin{align}
&\ \bigl[\mathbf A^{-1} \bigr]_{I,J} \det \mathbf A (e_1\wedge\ldots \wedge e_n) \\[2pt]
=&\ \pm (e_{j_1})\wedge \ldots \wedge(e_{j_k})\wedge (\mathbf A e_{i'_1})\wedge\ldots \wedge (\mathbf A e_{i'_{n-k}}) \\[2pt]
=&\ \pm [\mathbf A]_{J',I'}(e_1\wedge\ldots \wedge e_n).
\end{align}$$

The sign can be worked out to be
$$(-1)^{\left( \sum_{s=1}^{k} i_s - \sum_{s=1}^{k} j_s \right)},$$
so the sign is determined by the sums of elements in I and J.

=== Other applications ===
Given an i × j matrix with real entries (or entries from any other field) and rank r, then there exists at least one non-zero r × r minor, while all larger minors are zero.

We will use the following notation for minors: if A is an i × j matrix, I is a subset of {1, ..., i} with m elements, and J is a subset of {1, ..., j} with m elements, then we write [A]_{I, J} for the m × m minor of A that corresponds to the rows with index in I and the columns with index in J.

- If A is square and I = J, then [A]_{I, J} is called a principal minor.
- If A is square and I = J = {1, ..., m}, then the principal minor [A]_{I, J} is called a leading principal minor (of order m) or corner (principal) minor (of order m). For an i × i square matrix, there are i leading principal minors.
- A basic minor of a matrix with rank r is an r × r minor with nonzero value.
- For Hermitian matrices, the leading principal minors can be used to test for positive definiteness and the principal minors can be used to test for positive semidefiniteness. See Sylvester's criterion for more details.

Both the formula for ordinary matrix multiplication and the Cauchy–Binet formula for the determinant of the product of two matrices are special cases of the following general statement about the minors of a product of two matrices. Suppose that A is an i × k matrix, B is an k × j matrix, I is a subset of {1, ..., i} with m elements and J is a subset of {1, ..., j} with m elements. Then
$$[\mathbf{AB}]_{I,J} = \sum_{K} [\mathbf{A}]_{I,K} [\mathbf{B}]_{K,J}\,$$
where the sum extends over all subsets K of {1, ..., k} with m elements.

== Multilinear algebra approach ==
A more systematic, algebraic treatment of minors is given in multilinear algebra, using the wedge product: the k-minors of a matrix are the entries in the k-th exterior power map.

If the columns of a matrix are wedged together k at a time, the k × k minors appear as the components of the resulting k-vectors. For example, the 2 × 2 minors of the matrix
$$\begin{pmatrix}
1 & 4 \\
3 & \!\!-1 \\
2 & 1 \\
\end{pmatrix}$$
are −13 (from the first two rows), −7 (from the first and last row), and 5 (from the last two rows). Now consider the wedge product
$$(\mathbf{e}_1 + 3\mathbf{e}_2 + 2\mathbf{e}_3) \wedge (4\mathbf{e}_1 - \mathbf{e}_2 + \mathbf{e}_3)$$
where the two expressions correspond to the two columns of our matrix. Using the properties of the wedge product, namely that it is bilinear and alternating,
$$\mathbf{e}_i \wedge \mathbf{e}_i = 0,$$
and antisymmetric,
$$\mathbf{e}_i\wedge \mathbf{e}_j = - \mathbf{e}_j\wedge \mathbf{e}_i,$$
we can simplify this expression to
$$-13 \mathbf{e}_1\wedge \mathbf{e}_2 -7 \mathbf{e}_1\wedge \mathbf{e}_3 +5 \mathbf{e}_2\wedge \mathbf{e}_3$$
where the coefficients agree with the minors computed earlier.

== A remark about different notation ==
In some books, instead of cofactor the term adjunct is used. Moreover, it is denoted as A_{ij} and defined in the same way as cofactor:
$$\mathbf{A}_{ij} = (-1)^{i+j} \mathbf{M}_{ij}$$

Using this notation the inverse matrix is written this way:
$$\mathbf{M}^{-1} = \frac{1}{\det(M)}\begin{bmatrix}
A_{11}  & A_{21} & \cdots &   A_{n1}   \\
A_{12}  & A_{22} & \cdots &   A_{n2}   \\
\vdots & \vdots & \ddots & \vdots \\
A_{1n}  & A_{2n} & \cdots &  A_{nn}
\end{bmatrix}$$

Keep in mind that adjunct is not adjugate or adjoint. In modern terminology, the "adjoint" of a matrix most often refers to the corresponding adjoint operator.

== See also ==
- Submatrix
- Compound matrix
