= Adjugate matrix =

For a square matrix, the transpose of the cofactor matrix

In linear algebra, the adjugate or classical adjoint adj(A) of a square matrix A is the transpose of its cofactor matrix. It is occasionally known as adjunct matrix, or "adjoint", though that normally refers to a different concept, the adjoint operator which for a real matrix is the transpose.

The product of a matrix with its adjugate gives a diagonal matrix (entries not on the main diagonal are zero) whose diagonal entries are the determinant of the original matrix:
$$\mathbf{A} \operatorname{adj}(\mathbf{A}) = \det(\mathbf{A}) \mathbf{I},$$
where I is the identity matrix of the same size as A. Consequently, the multiplicative inverse of an invertible matrix can be found by dividing its adjugate by its determinant.

== Definition ==
The adjugate of A is the transpose of the cofactor matrix C of A,
$$\operatorname{adj}(\mathbf{A}) = \mathbf{C}^\mathsf{T}.$$

In more detail, suppose R is a (unital) commutative ring and A is an n × n matrix with entries from R. The (i, j)-minor of A, denoted M_{ij}, is the determinant of the (n − 1) × (n − 1) matrix that results from deleting row i and column j of A. The cofactor matrix of A is the n × n matrix C whose (i, j) entry is the (i, j) cofactor of A, which is the (i, j)-minor times a sign factor:
$$\mathbf{C} = \left((-1)^{i+j} M_{ij}\right)_{1 \le i, j \le n}.$$
The adjugate of A is the transpose of C, that is, the n × n matrix whose (i, j) entry is the (j,i) cofactor of A,
$$\operatorname{adj}(\mathbf{A}) = \mathbf{C}^\mathsf{T} = \left((-1)^{i+j} {M}_{ji}\right)_{1 \le i, j \le n}.$$

=== Important consequence ===
The adjugate is defined so that the product of A with its adjugate yields a diagonal matrix whose diagonal entries are the determinant det(A). That is,
$$\mathbf{A} \operatorname{adj}(\mathbf{A}) = \operatorname{adj}(\mathbf{A}) \mathbf{A} = \det(\mathbf{A}) \mathbf{I},$$
where I is the n × n identity matrix. This is a consequence of the Laplace expansion of the determinant.

The above formula implies one of the fundamental results in matrix algebra, that A is invertible if and only if det(A) is an invertible element of R. When this holds, the equation above yields
$$\begin{align}
\operatorname{adj}(\mathbf{A}) &= \det(\mathbf{A}) \mathbf{A}^{-1}, \\
\mathbf{A}^{-1} &= \det(\mathbf{A})^{-1} \operatorname{adj}(\mathbf{A}).
\end{align}$$

== Examples ==
=== 1 × 1 generic matrix ===
Since the determinant of a 0 × 0 matrix is 1, the adjugate of any 1 × 1 matrix (complex scalar) is
$$\mathbf{I} = \begin{bmatrix} 1 \end{bmatrix}$$
. Observe that $\mathbf{A} \operatorname{adj}(\mathbf{A}) = \operatorname{adj}(\mathbf{A})\mathbf{A} = (\det \mathbf{A}) \mathbf {I}.$

=== 2 × 2 generic matrix ===
The adjugate of the 2 × 2 matrix
$$\mathbf{A} = \begin{bmatrix} a & b \\ c  & d \end{bmatrix}$$
is
$$\operatorname{adj}(\mathbf{A}) = \begin{bmatrix} d & -b \\ -c & a \end{bmatrix}.$$
By direct computation,
$$\mathbf{A} \operatorname{adj}(\mathbf{A}) = \begin{bmatrix} ad - bc & 0 \\ 0 & ad - bc \end{bmatrix} = (\det \mathbf{A})\mathbf{I}.$$
In this case, it is also true that det(adj(A)) = det(A) and hence that adj(adj(A)) = A.

=== 3 × 3 generic matrix ===
Consider a 3 × 3 matrix
$$\mathbf{A} = \begin{bmatrix}
a_{1} & a_{2} & a_{3} \\
b_{1} & b_{2} & b_{3} \\
c_{1} & c_{2} & c_{3}
\end{bmatrix}.$$
Its cofactor matrix is
$$\mathbf{C} = \begin{bmatrix}
+\begin{vmatrix} b_{2} & b_{3} \\ c_{2} & c_{3} \end{vmatrix} &
-\begin{vmatrix} b_{1} & b_{3} \\ c_{1} & c_{3} \end{vmatrix} &
+\begin{vmatrix} b_{1} & b_{2} \\ c_{1} & c_{2} \end{vmatrix} \\
\\
-\begin{vmatrix} a_{2} & a_{3} \\ c_{2} & c_{3} \end{vmatrix} &
+\begin{vmatrix} a_{1} & a_{3} \\ c_{1} & c_{3} \end{vmatrix} &
-\begin{vmatrix} a_{1} & a_{2} \\ c_{1} & c_{2} \end{vmatrix} \\
\\
+\begin{vmatrix} a_{2} & a_{3} \\ b_{2} & b_{3} \end{vmatrix} &
-\begin{vmatrix} a_{1} & a_{3} \\ b_{1} & b_{3} \end{vmatrix} &
+\begin{vmatrix} a_{1} & a_{2} \\ b_{1} & b_{2} \end{vmatrix}
\end{bmatrix},$$
where
$$\begin{vmatrix} a & b \\ c & d \end{vmatrix}
= \det\!\begin{bmatrix} a & b \\ c & d \end{bmatrix} .$$

Its adjugate is the transpose of its cofactor matrix,
$$\operatorname{adj}(\mathbf{A}) = \mathbf{C}^\mathsf{T} = \begin{bmatrix}
+\begin{vmatrix} b_{2} & b_{3} \\ c_{2} & c_{3} \end{vmatrix} &
-\begin{vmatrix} a_{2} & a_{3} \\ c_{2} & c_{3} \end{vmatrix} &
+\begin{vmatrix} a_{2} & a_{3} \\ b_{2} & b_{3} \end{vmatrix} \\
& & \\
-\begin{vmatrix} b_{1} & b_{3} \\ c_{1} & c_{3} \end{vmatrix} &
+\begin{vmatrix} a_{1} & a_{3} \\ c_{1} & c_{3} \end{vmatrix} &
-\begin{vmatrix} a_{1} & a_{3} \\ b_{1} & b_{3} \end{vmatrix} \\
& & \\
+\begin{vmatrix} b_{1} & b_{2} \\ c_{1} & c_{2} \end{vmatrix} &
-\begin{vmatrix} a_{1} & a_{2} \\ c_{1} & c_{2} \end{vmatrix} &
+\begin{vmatrix} a_{1} & a_{2} \\ b_{1} & b_{2} \end{vmatrix}
\end{bmatrix}.$$

=== 3 × 3 numeric matrix ===
As a specific example, we have
$$\operatorname{adj}\!\begin{bmatrix}
-3 &  2 & -5 \\
-1 &  0 & -2 \\
3 & -4 &  1
\end{bmatrix} = \begin{bmatrix}
-8 & 18 & -4 \\
-5 & 12 & -1 \\
4 & -6 &  2
\end{bmatrix}.$$
It is easy to check the adjugate is the inverse times the determinant, −6.

The −1 in the second row, third column of the adjugate was computed as follows. The (2,3) entry of the adjugate is the (3,2) cofactor of A. This cofactor is computed using the submatrix obtained by deleting the third row and second column of the original matrix A,
$$\begin{bmatrix} -3 & -5 \\ -1 & -2 \end{bmatrix}.$$
The (3,2) cofactor is a sign times the determinant of this submatrix:
$$(-1)^{3+2}\operatorname{det}\!\begin{bmatrix}-3&-5\\-1&-2\end{bmatrix} = -(-3 \cdot -2 - -5 \cdot -1) = -1,$$
and this is the (2,3) entry of the adjugate.

== Properties ==
For any n × n matrix A, elementary computations show that adjugates have the following properties:

- $\operatorname{adj}(\mathbf{I}) = \mathbf{I}$, where $\mathbf{I}$ is the identity matrix.
- $\operatorname{adj}(\mathbf{0}) = \mathbf{0}$, where $\mathbf{0}$ is the zero matrix, except that if $n=1$ then $\operatorname{adj}(\mathbf{0}) = \mathbf{I}$.
- $\operatorname{adj}(c \mathbf{A}) = c^{n - 1}\operatorname{adj}(\mathbf{A})$ for any scalar c.
- $\operatorname{adj}(\mathbf{A}^\mathsf{T}) = \operatorname{adj}(\mathbf{A})^\mathsf{T}$.
- $\det(\operatorname{adj}(\mathbf{A})) = (\det \mathbf{A})^{n-1}$.
- If A is invertible, then $\operatorname{adj}(\mathbf{A}) = (\det \mathbf{A}) \mathbf{A}^{-1}$. It follows that:
  - adj(A) is invertible with inverse (det A)^{−1}A.
  - adj(A^{−1}) = adj(A)^{−1}.
- adj(A) is entrywise polynomial in A. In particular, over the real or complex numbers, the adjugate is a smooth function of the entries of A.

Over the complex numbers,

- $\operatorname{adj}(\overline\mathbf{A}) = \overline{\operatorname{adj}(\mathbf{A})}$, where the bar denotes complex conjugation.
- $\operatorname{adj}(\mathbf{A}^*) = \operatorname{adj}(\mathbf{A})^*$, where the asterisk denotes conjugate transpose.

Suppose that B is another n × n matrix. Then
$$\operatorname{adj}(\mathbf{AB}) = \operatorname{adj}(\mathbf{B})\operatorname{adj}(\mathbf{A}).$$
This can be proved in three ways. One way, valid for any commutative ring, is a direct computation using the Cauchy–Binet formula. The second way, valid for the real or complex numbers, is to first observe that for invertible matrices A and B,
$$\operatorname{adj}(\mathbf{B})\operatorname{adj}(\mathbf{A}) = (\det \mathbf{B})\mathbf{B}^{-1}(\det \mathbf{A})\mathbf{A}^{-1} = (\det \mathbf{AB})(\mathbf{AB})^{-1} = \operatorname{adj}(\mathbf{AB}).$$
Because every non-invertible matrix is the limit of invertible matrices, continuity of the adjugate then implies that the formula remains true when one of A or B is not invertible.

A corollary of the previous formula is that, for any non-negative integer k,
$$\operatorname{adj}(\mathbf{A}^k) = \operatorname{adj}(\mathbf{A})^k.$$
If A is invertible, then the above formula also holds for negative k.

From the identity
$$(\mathbf{A} + \mathbf{B})\operatorname{adj}(\mathbf{A} + \mathbf{B})\mathbf{B} = \det(\mathbf{A} + \mathbf{B})\mathbf{B} = \mathbf{B}\operatorname{adj}(\mathbf{A} + \mathbf{B})(\mathbf{A} + \mathbf{B}),$$
we deduce
$$\mathbf{A}\operatorname{adj}(\mathbf{A} + \mathbf{B})\mathbf{B} = \mathbf{B}\operatorname{adj}(\mathbf{A} + \mathbf{B})\mathbf{A}.$$

Suppose that A commutes with B. Multiplying the identity AB = BA on the left and right by adj(A) proves that
$$\det(\mathbf{A})\operatorname{adj}(\mathbf{A})\mathbf{B} = \det(\mathbf{A})\mathbf{B}\operatorname{adj}(\mathbf{A}).$$
If A is invertible, this implies that adj(A) also commutes with B. Over the real or complex numbers, continuity implies that adj(A) commutes with B even when A is not invertible.

Finally, there is a more general proof than the second proof, which only requires that an n × n matrix has entries over a field with at least 2n + 1 elements (e.g. a 5 × 5 matrix over the integers modulo 11). det(A+tI) is a polynomial in t with degree at most n, so it has at most n roots. Note that the ijth entry of adj((A+tI)(B)) is a polynomial of at most order n, and likewise for adj(A+tI)adj(B). These two polynomials at the ijth entry agree on at least n + 1 points, as we have at least n + 1 elements of the field where A+tI is invertible, and we have proven the identity for invertible matrices. Polynomials of degree n which agree on n + 1 points must be identical (subtract them from each other and you have n + 1 roots for a polynomial of degree at most n – a contradiction unless their difference is identically zero). As the two polynomials are identical, they take the same value for every value of t. Thus, they take the same value when t = 0.

Using the above properties and other elementary computations, it is straightforward to show that if A has one of the following properties, then adjA does as well:

- upper triangular,
- lower triangular,
- diagonal,
- orthogonal,
- unitary,
- symmetric,
- Hermitian,
- normal.

If A is skew-symmetric, then adj(A) is skew-symmetric for even n and symmetric for odd n. Similarly, if A is skew-Hermitian, then adj(A) is skew-Hermitian for even n and Hermitian for odd n.

If A is invertible, then, as noted above, there is a formula for adj(A) in terms of the determinant and inverse of A. When A is not invertible, the adjugate satisfies different but closely related formulas.

- If rk(A) ≤ n − 2, then adj(A) = 0.
- If rk(A) = n − 1, then rk(adj(A)) = 1. (Some minor is non-zero, so adj(A) is non-zero and hence has rank at least one; the identity adj(A)A = 0 implies that the dimension of the nullspace of adj(A) is at least n − 1, so its rank is at most one.) It follows that adj(A) = αxy^{T}, where α is a scalar and x and y are vectors such that Ax = 0 and A^{T} y = 0.

=== Column substitution and Cramer's rule ===
Partition A into column vectors:
$$\mathbf{A} = \begin{bmatrix}\mathbf{a}_1 & \cdots & \mathbf{a}_n\end{bmatrix}.$$
Let b be a column vector of size n. Fix 1 ≤ i ≤ n and consider the matrix formed by replacing column i of A by b:
$$(\mathbf{A} \stackrel{i}{\leftarrow} \mathbf{b})\ \stackrel{\text{def}}{=}\ \begin{bmatrix} \mathbf{a}_1 & \cdots & \mathbf{a}_{i-1} & \mathbf{b} & \mathbf{a}_{i+1} & \cdots & \mathbf{a}_n \end{bmatrix}.$$
Laplace expand the determinant of this matrix along column i. The result is entry i of the product adj(A)b. Collecting these determinants for the different possible i yields an equality of column vectors
$$\left(\det(\mathbf{A} \stackrel{i}{\leftarrow} \mathbf{b})\right)_{i=1}^n = \operatorname{adj}(\mathbf{A})\mathbf{b}.$$

This formula has the following concrete consequence. Consider the linear system of equations
$$\mathbf{A}\mathbf{x} = \mathbf{b}.$$
Assume that A is non-singular. Multiplying this system on the left by adj(A) and dividing by the determinant yields
$$\mathbf{x} = \frac{\operatorname{adj}(\mathbf{A})\mathbf{b}}{\det \mathbf{A}}.$$
Applying the previous formula to this situation yields Cramer's rule,
$$x_i = \frac{\det(\mathbf{A} \stackrel{i}{\leftarrow} \mathbf{b})}{\det \mathbf{A}},$$
where x_{i} is the ith entry of x.

=== Characteristic polynomial ===
Let the characteristic polynomial of A be
$$p(s) = \det(s\mathbf{I} - \mathbf{A}) = \sum_{i=0}^n p_i s^i \in R[s].$$
The first divided difference of p is a symmetric polynomial of degree n − 1,
$$\Delta p(s, t) = \frac{p(s) - p(t)}{s - t} = \sum_{0 \le j + k < n} p_{j+k+1} s^j t^k \in R[s, t].$$
Multiply sI − A by its adjugate. Since p(A) = 0 by the Cayley–Hamilton theorem, some elementary manipulations reveal
$$\operatorname{adj}(s\mathbf{I} - \mathbf{A}) = \Delta p(s\mathbf{I}, \mathbf{A}).$$

In particular, the resolvent of A is defined to be
$$R(z; \mathbf{A}) = (z\mathbf{I} - \mathbf{A})^{-1},$$
and by the above formula, this is equal to
$$R(z; \mathbf{A}) = \frac{\Delta p(z\mathbf{I}, \mathbf{A})}{p(z)}.$$

=== Jacobi's formula ===
The adjugate also appears in Jacobi's formula for the derivative of the determinant. If A(t) is continuously differentiable, then
$$\frac{d(\det \mathbf{A})}{dt}(t) = \operatorname{tr}\left(\operatorname{adj}(\mathbf{A}(t)) \mathbf{A}'(t)\right).$$
It follows that the total derivative of the determinant is the transpose of the adjugate:
$$d(\det \mathbf{A})_{\mathbf{A}_0} = \operatorname{adj}(\mathbf{A}_0)^{\mathsf{T}}.$$

=== Cayley–Hamilton formula ===
Let p_{A}(t) be the characteristic polynomial of A. The Cayley–Hamilton theorem states that
$$p_{\mathbf{A}}(\mathbf{A}) = \mathbf{0}.$$
Separating the constant term and multiplying the equation by adj(A) gives an expression for the adjugate that depends only on A and the coefficients of p_{A}(t). These coefficients can be explicitly represented in terms of traces of powers of A using complete exponential Bell polynomials. The resulting formula is
$$\operatorname{adj}(\mathbf{A}) = \sum_{s=0}^{n-1} \mathbf{A}^{s} \sum_{k_1, k_2, \ldots, k_{n-1}} \prod_{\ell=1}^{n-1} \frac{(-1)^{k_\ell+1}}{\ell^{k_\ell}k_{\ell}!}\operatorname{tr}(\mathbf{A}^\ell)^{k_\ell},$$
where n is the dimension of A, and the sum is taken over s and all sequences of k_{l} ≥ 0 satisfying the linear Diophantine equation
$$s+\sum_{\ell=1}^{n-1}\ell k_\ell = n - 1.$$

For the 2 × 2 case, this gives
$$\operatorname{adj}(\mathbf{A})=\mathbf{I}_2(\operatorname{tr}\mathbf{A}) - \mathbf{A}.$$
For the 3 × 3 case, this gives
$$\operatorname{adj}(\mathbf{A})=\frac{1}{2}\mathbf{I}_3\!\left( (\operatorname{tr}\mathbf{A})^2-\operatorname{tr}\mathbf{A}^2\right) - \mathbf{A}(\operatorname{tr}\mathbf{A}) + \mathbf{A}^2 .$$
For the 4 × 4 case, this gives
$$\operatorname{adj}(\mathbf{A})=
\frac{1}{6}\mathbf{I}_4\!\left(
(\operatorname{tr}\mathbf{A})^3
- 3\operatorname{tr}\mathbf{A}\operatorname{tr}\mathbf{A}^2
+ 2\operatorname{tr}\mathbf{A}^{3}
\right)
- \frac{1}{2}\mathbf{A}\!\left( (\operatorname{tr}\mathbf{A})^2 - \operatorname{tr}\mathbf{A}^2\right)
+ \mathbf{A}^2(\operatorname{tr}\mathbf{A})
- \mathbf{A}^3.$$

The same formula follows directly from the terminating step of the Faddeev–LeVerrier algorithm, which efficiently determines the characteristic polynomial of A.

In general, adjugate matrix of arbitrary dimension N matrix can be computed by Einstein's convention.
$$(\operatorname{adj}(\mathbf{A}))_{i_N}^{j_N} = \frac{1}{(N-1)!} \epsilon_{i_1 i_2 \ldots i_N}  \epsilon^{j_1 j_2 \ldots j_N} A_{j_1}^{i_1} A_{j_2}^{i_2} \ldots A_{j_{N-1}}^{i_{N-1}}$$

== Relation to exterior algebras ==
The adjugate can be viewed in abstract terms using exterior algebras. Let V be an n-dimensional vector space. The exterior product defines a bilinear pairing
$$V \times \wedge^{n-1} V \to \wedge^n V.$$
Abstractly, $\wedge^n V$ is isomorphic to R, and under any such isomorphism the exterior product is a perfect pairing. That is, it yields an isomorphism
$$\phi \colon V\ \xrightarrow{\cong}\ \operatorname{Hom}(\wedge^{n-1} V, \wedge^n V).$$
This isomorphism sends each v ∈ V to the map $\phi_{\mathbf{v}}$ defined by
$$\phi_\mathbf{v}(\alpha) = \mathbf{v} \wedge \alpha.$$
Suppose that T : V → V is a linear transformation. Pullback by the (n − 1)th exterior power of T induces a morphism of Hom spaces. The adjugate of T is the composite
$$V\ \xrightarrow{\phi}\ \operatorname{Hom}(\wedge^{n-1} V, \wedge^n V)\ \xrightarrow{(\wedge^{n-1} T)^*}\ \operatorname{Hom}(\wedge^{n-1} V, \wedge^n V)\ \xrightarrow{\phi^{-1}}\ V.$$

If V = R^{n} is endowed with its canonical basis e_{1}, ..., e_{n}, and if the matrix of T in this basis is A, then the adjugate of T is the adjugate of A. To see why, give $\wedge^{n-1} \mathbf{R}^n$ the basis
$$\{\mathbf{e}_1 \wedge \dots \wedge \hat\mathbf{e}_k \wedge \dots \wedge \mathbf{e}_n\}_{k=1}^n.$$
Fix a basis vector e_{i} of R^{n}. The image of e_{i} under $\phi$ is determined by where it sends basis vectors:
$$\phi_{\mathbf{e}_i}(\mathbf{e}_1 \wedge \dots \wedge \hat\mathbf{e}_k \wedge \dots \wedge \mathbf{e}_n)
= \begin{cases} (-1)^{i-1} \mathbf{e}_1 \wedge \dots \wedge \mathbf{e}_n, &\text{if}\ k = i, \\ 0 &\text{otherwise.} \end{cases}$$
On basis vectors, the (n − 1)st exterior power of T is
$$\mathbf{e}_1 \wedge \dots \wedge \hat\mathbf{e}_j \wedge \dots \wedge \mathbf{e}_n \mapsto \sum_{k=1}^n (\det A_{jk}) \mathbf{e}_1 \wedge \dots \wedge \hat\mathbf{e}_k \wedge \dots \wedge \mathbf{e}_n.$$
Each of these terms maps to zero under $\phi_{\mathbf{e}_i}$ except the k = i term. Therefore, the pullback of $\phi_{\mathbf{e}_i}$ is the linear transformation for which
$$\mathbf{e}_1 \wedge \dots \wedge \hat\mathbf{e}_j \wedge \dots \wedge \mathbf{e}_n \mapsto (-1)^{i-1} (\det A_{ji}) \mathbf{e}_1 \wedge \dots \wedge \mathbf{e}_n.$$
That is, it equals
$$\sum_{j=1}^n (-1)^{i+j} (\det A_{ji})\phi_{\mathbf{e}_j}.$$
Applying the inverse of $\phi$ shows that the adjugate of T is the linear transformation for which
$$\mathbf{e}_i \mapsto \sum_{j=1}^n (-1)^{i+j}(\det A_{ji})\mathbf{e}_j.$$
Consequently, its matrix representation is the adjugate of A.

If V is endowed with an inner product and a volume form, then the map φ can be decomposed further. In this case, φ can be understood as the composite of the Hodge star operator and dualization. Specifically, if ω is the volume form, then it, together with the inner product, determines an isomorphism
$$\omega^\vee \colon \wedge^n V \to \mathbf{R}.$$
This induces an isomorphism
$$\operatorname{Hom}(\wedge^{n-1} \mathbf{R}^n, \wedge^n \mathbf{R}^n) \cong \wedge^{n-1} (\mathbf{R}^n)^\vee.$$
A vector v in R^{n} corresponds to the linear functional
$$(\alpha \mapsto \omega^\vee(\mathbf{v} \wedge \alpha)) \in \wedge^{n-1} (\mathbf{R}^n)^\vee.$$
By the definition of the Hodge star operator, this linear functional is dual to *v. That is, ω^{∨}∘ φ equals v ↦ *v^{∨}.

== Higher adjugates ==
Let A be an n × n matrix, and fix r ≥ 0. The rth higher adjugate of A is an $\binom{n}{r} \!\times\! \binom{n}{r}$ matrix, denoted adj_{r} A, whose entries are indexed by size r subsets I and J of {1, ..., m}. Let I^{c} and J^{c} denote the complements of I and J, respectively. Also let $\mathbf{A}_{I^c, J^c}$ denote the submatrix of A containing those rows and columns whose indices are in I^{c} and J^{c}, respectively. Then the (I, J) entry of adj_{r} A is
$$(-1)^{\sigma(I) + \sigma(J)}\det \mathbf{A}_{J^c, I^c},$$
where σ(I) and σ(J) are the sum of the elements of I and J, respectively.

Basic properties of higher adjugates include:

- adj_{0}(A) = det A.
- adj_{1}(A) = adj A.
- adj_{n}(A) = 1.
- adj_{r}(BA) = adj_{r}(A) adj_{r}(B).
- $\operatorname{adj}_r(\mathbf{A})C_r(\mathbf{A}) = C_r(\mathbf{A})\operatorname{adj}_r(\mathbf{A}) = (\det \mathbf{A})I_{\binom{n}{r}}$, where C_{r}(A) denotes the rth compound matrix.

Higher adjugates may be defined in abstract algebraic terms in a similar fashion to the usual adjugate, substituting $\wedge^r V$ and $\wedge^{n-r} V$ for $V$ and $\wedge^{n-1} V$, respectively.

== Iterated adjugates ==
Iteratively taking the adjugate of an invertible matrix A k times yields

$$\overbrace{\operatorname{adj}\dotsm\operatorname{adj}}^k(\mathbf{A})=\det(\mathbf{A})^{\frac{(n-1)^k-(-1)^k}n}\mathbf{A}^{(-1)^k},$$
$$\det(\overbrace{\operatorname{adj}\dotsm\operatorname{adj}}^k(\mathbf{A}))=\det(\mathbf{A})^{(n-1)^k}.$$

For example,

$$\operatorname{adj}(\operatorname{adj}(\mathbf{A})) = \det(\mathbf{A})^{n - 2} \mathbf{A}.$$
$$\det(\operatorname{adj}(\operatorname{adj}(\mathbf{A}))) = \det(\mathbf{A})^{(n - 1)^2}.$$

== See also ==
- Cayley–Hamilton theorem
- Cramer's rule
- Trace diagram
- Jacobi's formula
- Faddeev–LeVerrier algorithm
- Compound matrix

== Bibliography ==
- Roger A. Horn and Charles R. Johnson (2013), Matrix Analysis, Second Edition. Cambridge University Press, ISBN 978-0-521-54823-6
- Roger A. Horn and Charles R. Johnson (1991), Topics in Matrix Analysis. Cambridge University Press, ISBN 978-0-521-46713-1
