= Trigonometric moment problem =

In mathematics, the trigonometric moment problem is formulated as follows: given a sequence $\{c_k\}_{k \in \mathbb{N}_{0}}$, does there exist a distribution function $\sigma$ on the interval $[0,2\pi]$ such that:
$$c_k = \frac{1}{2 \pi}\int_0 ^{2 \pi} e^{-ik\theta}\,d \sigma(\theta),$$
with $c_{-k} = \overline{c}_k$ for $k \geq 1$. An affirmative answer to the problem means that $\{c_k\}_{k \in \mathbb{N}_{0}}$ are the Fourier-Stieltjes coefficients for some (consequently positive) unique Radon measure $\mu$ on $[0,2\pi]$ as distribution function.

In case the sequence is finite, i.e., $\{c_k\}_{k = 0}^{n < \infty}$, it is referred to as the truncated trigonometric moment problem.

== Characterization ==
The trigonometric moment problem is solvable, that is, $\{c_k\}_{k=0}^{n}$ is a sequence of Fourier coefficients, if and only if the (n + 1) × (n + 1) Hermitian Toeplitz matrix
$$T =
\left(\begin{matrix}
c_0       & c_1           & \cdots   & c_n     \\
c_{-1} & c_0           & \cdots   & c_{n-1} \\
\vdots         & \vdots             & \ddots   & \vdots       \\
c_{-n} & c_{-n+1} & \cdots   & c_0     \\
\end{matrix}\right)$$
with $c_{-k}=\overline{c_{k}}$ for $k \geq 1$, is positive semi-definite.

The "only if" part of the claims can be verified by a direct calculation. We sketch an argument for the converse. The positive semidefinite matrix $T$ defines a sesquilinear product on $\mathbb{C}^{n+1}$, resulting in a Hilbert space
$$(\mathcal{H}, \langle \;,\; \rangle)$$
of dimensional at most n + 1. The Toeplitz structure of $T$ means that a "truncated" shift is a partial isometry on $\mathcal{H}$. More specifically, let $\{e_0,\dotsc,e_n\}$ be the standard basis of $\mathbb{C}^{n+1}$. Let $\mathcal{E}$ and $\mathcal{F}$ be subspaces generated by the equivalence classes $\{[e_0],\dotsc,[e_{n-1}]\}$ respectively $\{[e_1],\dotsc,[e_{n}]\}$. Define an operator
$$V: \mathcal{E} \rightarrow \mathcal{F}$$
by
$$V[e_k] = [e_{k+1}] \quad \mbox{for} \quad k = 0 \ldots n-1.$$
Since
$$\langle V[e_j], V[e_k] \rangle = \langle [e_{j+1}], [e_{k+1}] \rangle = T_{j+1, k+1} = T_{j, k} = \langle [e_{j}], [e_{k}] \rangle,$$
$V$ can be extended to a partial isometry acting on all of $\mathcal{H}$. Take a minimal unitary extension $U$ of $V$, on a possibly larger space (this always exists). According to the spectral theorem, there exists a Borel measure $m$ on the unit circle $\mathbb{T}$ such that for all integer k
$$\langle (U^*)^k [ e_ {n+1} ], [ e_ {n+1} ] \rangle = \int_{\mathbb{T}} z^{k} dm .$$
For $k = 0,\dotsc,n$, the left hand side is
$$\langle (U^*)^k [ e_ {n+1} ], [ e_ {n+1} ] \rangle
= \langle (V^*)^k [ e_ {n+1} ],  [ e_{n+1} ] \rangle
= \langle [e_{n+1-k}], [ e_{n+1} ] \rangle
= T_{n+1, n+1-k}
= c_{-k}=\overline{c_k}.$$
As such, there is a $j$-atomic measure $m$ on $\mathbb{T}$, with $j \leq 2n + 1 < \infty$ (i.e. the set is finite), such that
$$c_k = \int_{\mathbb{T}} z^{-k} dm
= \int_{\mathbb{T}} \bar{z}^k dm,$$
which is equivalent to
$$c_k = \frac{1}{2 \pi} \int_0 ^{2 \pi} e^{-ik\theta} d\mu(\theta).$$

for some suitable measure $\mu$.

=== Parametrization of solutions ===
The above discussion shows that the truncated trigonometric moment problem has infinitely many solutions if the Toeplitz matrix $T$ is invertible. In that case, the solutions to the problem are in bijective correspondence with minimal unitary extensions of the partial isometry $V$.

== See also ==
- Bochner's theorem
- Hamburger moment problem
- Moment problem
- Orthogonal polynomials on the unit circle
- Spectral measure
- Schur class
- Szegő limit theorems
- Wiener's lemma
