= Gábor Szegő =

Hungarian mathematician (1895–1985)

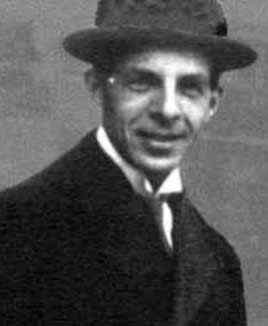
- Szegő in 1925
- Born: 20 January 1895; Kunhegyes, Austria-Hungary (now Hungary)
- Died: 7 August 1985 (aged 90); Palo Alto, California, U.S.
- Education: University of Vienna
- Known for: Fekete–Szegő inequality Pólya–Szegő inequality Grace–Walsh–Szegő coincidence theorem Rogers–Szegő polynomials Szegő kernel Szegő limit theorems Szegő polynomial Szegő theorem Szegő recurrence
- Scientific career
- Fields: Mathematics
- Workplaces: University of Königsberg; Washington University in St. Louis; Stanford University
- Thesis: Ein Grenzwertsatz über die Toeplitz Determinanten einer reellen Funktion (1918)
- Doctoral advisor: Wilhelm Wirtinger; Philipp Furtwängler
- Doctoral students: Paul Rosenbloom; Joseph Ullman

Gábor Szegő (Hungarian: [ˈɡaːbor ˈsɛɡøː]) (January 20, 1895 – August 7, 1985) was a Hungarian-American mathematician. He was one of the foremost mathematical analysts of his generation and made fundamental contributions to the theory of orthogonal polynomials and Toeplitz matrices building on the work of his contemporary Otto Toeplitz.

== Life ==
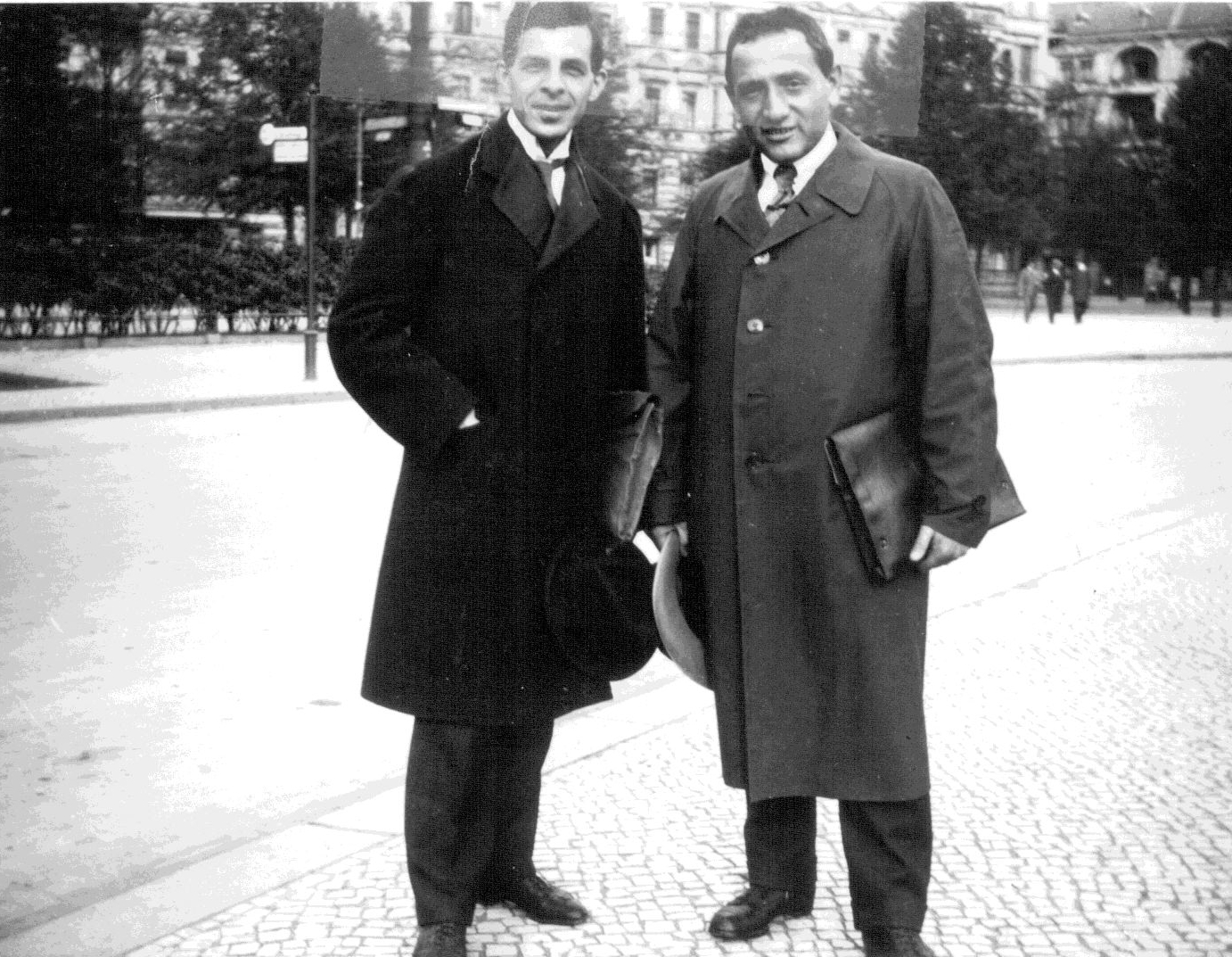
Szegő with George Pólya in Berlin, delivering the manuscript of Problems and Theorems in Analysis to Springer.

Szegő was born in Kunhegyes, Austria-Hungary (today Hungary), into a Jewish family as the son of Adolf Szegő and Hermina Neuman. He married the chemist Anna Elisabeth Neményi in 1919, with whom he had two children.

In 1912 he started studies in mathematical physics at the University of Budapest, with summer visits to the University of Berlin and the University of Göttingen, where he attended lectures by Frobenius and Hilbert, amongst others. In Budapest he was taught mainly by Fejér, Beke, Kürschák and Bauer and made the acquaintance of his future collaborators George Pólya and Michael Fekete. His studies were interrupted in 1915 by World War I, in which he served in the infantry, artillery and air corps. In 1918 while stationed in Vienna, he was awarded a doctorate by the University of Vienna for his work on Toeplitz determinants. He received his Privat-Dozent from the University of Berlin in 1921, where he stayed until being appointed as successor to Knopp at the University of Königsberg in 1926. Intolerable working conditions during the Nazi regime resulted in a temporary position at the Washington University in St. Louis, Missouri in 1936, before his appointment as chairman of the mathematics department at Stanford University in 1938, where he helped build up the department until his retirement in 1966. He died in Palo Alto, California. His doctoral students include Paul Rosenbloom and Joseph Ullman. The Gábor Szegö Prize, Szegő Gábor Primary School, and Szegő Gábor Matematikaverseny (a mathematics competition in his former school) are all named in his honor.

== Works ==
Szegő's most important work was in analysis. He was one of the foremost analysts of his generation and made fundamental contributions to the theory of Toeplitz matrices and orthogonal polynomials. He wrote over 130 papers in several languages. Each of his four books, several written in collaboration with others, has become a classic in its field. The monograph Orthogonal polynomials, published in 1939, contains much of his research and has had a profound influence in many areas of applied mathematics, including theoretical physics, stochastic processes and numerical analysis.

== Tutoring von Neumann ==
At the age of 15, the young John von Neumann, recognised as a mathematical prodigy, was sent to study advanced calculus under Szegő. On their first meeting, Szegő was so astounded by von Neumann's mathematical talent and speed that, as recalled by his wife, he came back home with tears in his eyes. Szegő subsequently visited the von Neumann house twice a week to tutor the child prodigy. Some of von Neumann's instant solutions to the problems in calculus posed by Szegő, sketched out on his father's stationery, are now on display at the von Neumann archive at Budapest.

== Honours ==
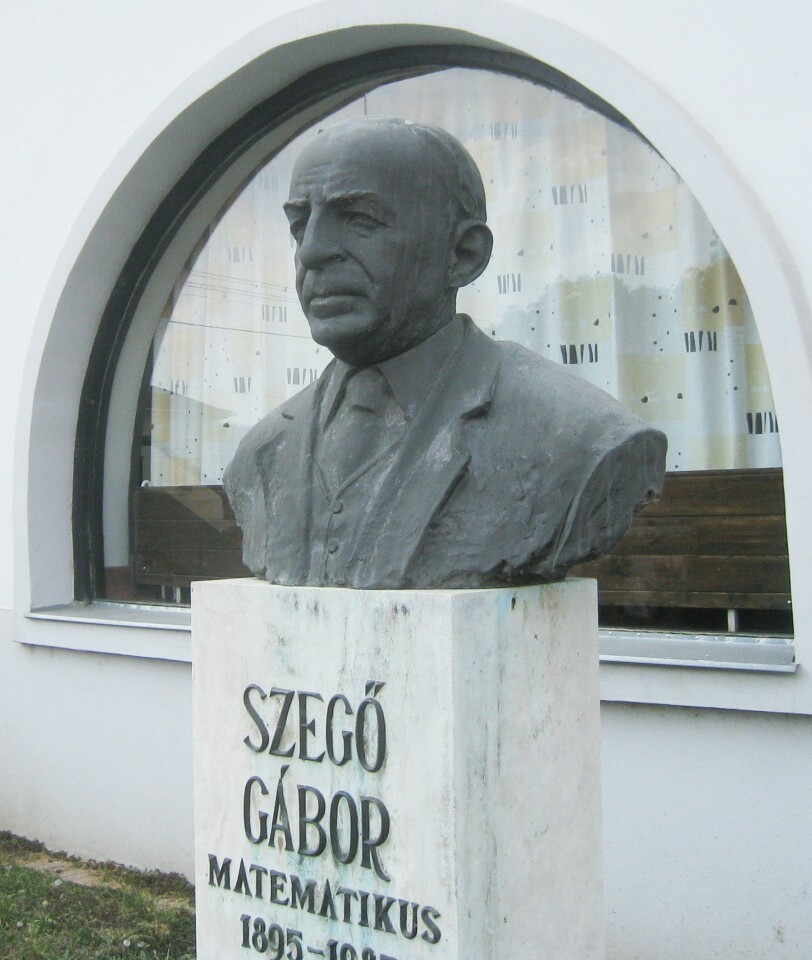
Bust of Gábor Szegő in his hometown of Kunhegyes

Amongst the many honours received during his lifetime were:

- Julius König Prize of the Hungarian Mathematical Society (1928)
- Member of the Königsberger Gelehrten Gesellschaft (1928)
- Corresponding member of the Austrian Academy of Sciences in Vienna (1960)
- Honorary member of the Hungarian Academy of Sciences (1965)

== Bibliography ==
- The collected Papers of Gábor Szegő, 3 Vols (ed. Richard Askey), Birkhäuser, 1982, ISBN 3-7643-3063-5
- Pólya, George; Szegő, Gábor (1972) [1925], Problems and Theorems in Analysis, 2 Vols, Springer-Verlag
- Szegő, Gábor (1933), Asymptotische Entwicklungen der Jacobischen Polynome, Niemeyer
- Szegő, Gábor (1939), Orthogonal Polynomials, American Mathematical Society; 2nd edn. 1955
- Pólya, George; Szegő, Gábor (2016) [1951], Isoperimetric problems in mathematical physics, Annals of Mathematics Studies, vol. 27, Princeton University Press, ISBN 0691079889
- Szegő, Gábor; Grenander, Ulf (1958), Toeplitz forms and their applications, Chelsea

== Selected articles ==
- Szegő, G. (1920). "Beiträge zur Theorie der Toeplitzschen Formen". Math. Z. 6 (3–4): 167–202. doi:10.1007/bf01199955. S2CID 118147030.
- Szegő, G. (1921). "Beiträge zur Theorie der Toeplitzschen Formen, II". Math. Z. 9 (3–4): 167–190. doi:10.1007/bf01279027. S2CID 125157848.
- Szegő, G. (1935). "A problem concerning orthogonal polynomials". Trans. Amer. Math. Soc. 37: 196–206. doi:10.1090/s0002-9947-1935-1501782-2. MR 1501782.
  - Szego, Gabriel (1936). "Correction". Trans. Amer. Math. Soc. 39 (3): 500. doi:10.2307/1989765. JSTOR 1989765. MR 1501861.
- Szegő, Gabriel (1936). "Inequalities for the zeros of Legendre polynomials and related functions". Trans. Amer. Math. Soc. 39: 1–17. doi:10.1090/s0002-9947-1936-1501831-2. MR 1501831.
- Szegő, Gabriel (1936). "On some Hermitian forms associated with two given curves of the complex plane". Trans. Amer. Math. Soc. 40 (3): 450–461. doi:10.1090/s0002-9947-1936-1501884-1. MR 1501884.
- Szegő, G. (1940). "On the gradient of solid harmonic polynomials". Trans. Amer. Math. Soc. 47: 51–65. doi:10.1090/s0002-9947-1940-0000847-6. MR 0000847.
- with A. C. Schaeffer: Schaeffer, A. C.; Szegő, G. (1941). "Inequalities for harmonic polynomials in two and three dimensions". Trans. Amer. Math. Soc. 50 (2): 187–225. doi:10.1090/s0002-9947-1941-0005164-7. MR 0005164.
- Szegő, G. (1942). "On the oscillations of differential transforms. I". Trans. Amer. Math. Soc. 52 (3): 450–462. doi:10.1090/s0002-9947-1942-0007170-6. MR 0007170.
- Szegő, G. (1943). "On the oscillations of differential transforms. IV. Jacobi polynomials". Trans. Amer. Math. Soc. 53 (3): 463–468. doi:10.1090/s0002-9947-1943-0008100-4. MR 0008100.
- with Max Schiffer: Schiffer, M.; Szegő, G. (1949). "Virtual mass and polarization". Trans. Amer. Math. Soc. 67: 130–205. doi:10.1090/s0002-9947-1949-0033922-9. MR 0033922.
- Szegő, G. (1950). "On certain special sets of orthogonal polynomials". Proc. Amer. Math. Soc. 1 (6): 731–737. doi:10.1090/s0002-9939-1950-0042546-2. MR 0042546.
- with Albert Edrei: Edrei, A.; Szegő, G. (1953). "A note on the reciprocal of a Fourier series". Proc. Amer. Math. Soc. 4 (2): 323–329. doi:10.1090/s0002-9939-1953-0053267-7. MR 0053267.
