= Monotonic function =

Order-preserving mathematical function

Figure 1. A monotonically non-decreasing function

Figure 2. A monotonically non-increasing function

Figure 3. A function that is not monotonic

In mathematics, a monotonic function (or monotone function) is a function between ordered sets that preserves or reverses the given order. The function is also called isotone in the first case, and antitone in the second. The concept of monotonic functions first arose in calculus, and was later generalized to the more abstract setting of order theory.

The term "monotone" is often mistakenly used to mean monotone increasing.

== In calculus and analysis ==
In calculus, a function $f$ defined on a subset of the real numbers with real values is called monotonic if it is either entirely non-decreasing, or entirely non-increasing. That is, as per Fig. 1, a function that increases monotonically does not exclusively have to increase, it simply must not decrease.

A function is termed monotonically increasing (also increasing or non-decreasing) if for all $x$ and $y$ such that $x \leq y$ one has $f\!\left(x\right) \leq f\!\left(y\right)$, so $f$ preserves the order (see Figure 1). Likewise, a function is called monotonically decreasing (also decreasing or non-increasing) if, whenever $x \leq y$, then $f\!\left(x\right) \geq f\!\left(y\right)$, so it reverses the order (see Figure 2).

If the order $\leq$ in the definition of monotonicity is replaced by the strict order $<$, one obtains a stronger requirement. A function with this property is called strictly increasing (also increasing). Again, by inverting the order symbol, one finds a corresponding concept called strictly decreasing (also decreasing). A function with either property is called strictly monotone. Functions that are strictly monotone are one-to-one (because for $x$ not equal to $y$, either $x < y$ or $x > y$ and so, by monotonicity, either $f\!\left(x\right) < f\!\left(y\right)$ or $f\!\left(x\right) > f\!\left(y\right)$, thus $f\!\left(x\right) \neq f\!\left(y\right)$.

To avoid ambiguity, the terms weakly monotone, weakly increasing and weakly decreasing are often used to refer to non-strict monotonicity.

The terms "non-decreasing" and "non-increasing" should not be confused with the (much weaker) negative qualifications "not decreasing" and "not increasing". For example, the non-monotonic function shown in figure 3 first falls, then rises, then falls again. It is therefore not decreasing and not increasing, but it is neither non-decreasing nor non-increasing.

A function $f$ is said to be absolutely monotonic over an interval $\left(a, b\right)$ if the derivatives of all orders of $f$ are nonnegative or all nonpositive at all points on the interval.

=== Inverse of function ===
All strictly monotonic functions are invertible because they are guaranteed to have a one-to-one mapping from their range to their domain.

However, functions that are only weakly monotone need not be invertible; they may be constant on some interval (and therefore not one-to-one).

A function may be strictly monotonic over a limited a range of values and thus have an inverse on that range even though it is not strictly monotonic everywhere. For example, if $y = g(x)$ is strictly increasing on the range $[a, b]$, then it has an inverse $x = h(y)$ on the range $[g(a), g(b)]$.

The term monotonic is sometimes used in place of strictly monotonic, so a source may state that all monotonic functions are invertible when they really mean that all strictly monotonic functions are invertible.

=== Monotonic transformation ===
The term monotonic transformation (or monotone transformation) may also cause confusion because it refers to a transformation by a strictly increasing function. This is the case in economics with respect to the ordinal properties of a utility function being preserved across a monotonic transform (see also monotone preferences). In this context, the term "monotonic transformation" refers to a positive monotonic transformation and is intended to distinguish it from a "negative monotonic transformation", which reverses the order of the numbers.

=== Some basic applications and results ===
Monotonic function with a dense set of jump discontinuities (several sections shown)

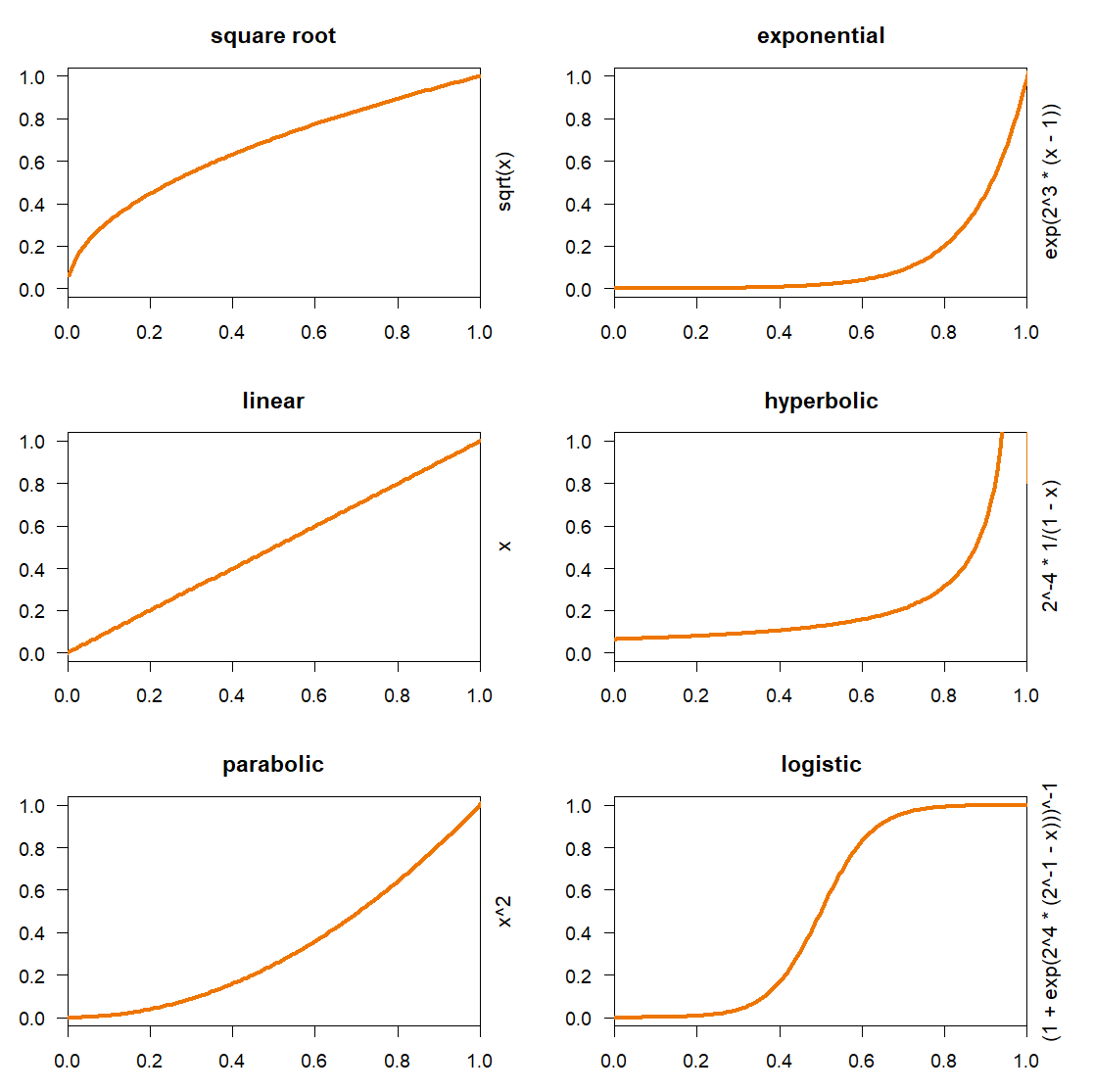
Plots of 6 monotonic growth functions

The following properties are true for a monotonic function $f\colon \mathbb{R} \to \mathbb{R}$:

- $f$ has limits from the right and from the left at every point of its domain;
- $f$ has a limit at positive or negative infinity ($\pm\infty$) of either a real number, $\infty$, or $-\infty$.
- $f$ can only have jump and removable discontinuities.
- $f$ can only have countably many discontinuities in its domain. The discontinuities, however, do not necessarily consist of isolated points and may even be dense in an interval (a, b). For example, for any summable sequence $(a_i)$ of positive numbers and any enumeration $(q_i)$ of the rational numbers, the monotonically increasing function
  $$f(x)=\sum_{q_i\leq x} a_i$$
  is continuous exactly at every irrational number (cf. picture). It is the cumulative distribution function of the discrete measure on the rational numbers, where $a_i$ is the weight of $q_i$.
- If $f$ is differentiable at $x^*\in\Bbb R$ and $f'(x^*)>0$, then there is a non-degenerate interval I such that $x^*\in I$ and $f$ is increasing on I.
- As a partial converse, if $f$ is differentiable and increasing on an interval, $I$, then its derivative is nonnegative at every point in $I$. Furthermore, the set $A = \{x\in I: f'(x) > 0\}$ is dense with positive Lebesgue measure. Not much more can be said about $A$; for instance, $A$ may be meagre, as in the case of a Pompeiu derivative, and for fixed $I$, the Lebesgue measure of $A$ can be made arbitrarily close to $0$ via a suitable choice of $f$.

These properties are the reason why monotonic functions are useful in technical work in analysis. Other important properties of these functions include:

- if $f$ is a monotonic function defined on an interval $I$, then $f$ is differentiable almost everywhere on $I$; i.e. the set of numbers $x$ in $I$ such that $f$ is not differentiable in $x$ has Lebesgue measure zero. In addition, this result cannot be improved to countable: see Cantor function.
- if this set is countable, then $f$ is absolutely continuous
- if $f$ is a monotonic function defined on an interval $\left[a, b\right]$, then $f$ is Riemann integrable.

An important application of monotonic functions is in probability theory. If $X$ is a random variable, its cumulative distribution function $F_X\!\left(x\right) = \text{Prob}\!\left(X \leq x\right)$ is a monotonically increasing function.

A function is unimodal if it is monotonically increasing up to some point (the mode) and then monotonically decreasing.

When $f$ is a strictly monotonic function, then $f$ is injective on its domain, and if $T$ is the range of $f$, then there is an inverse function on $T$ for $f$. In contrast, each constant function is monotonic, but not injective, and hence cannot have an inverse.

The graphic shows six monotonic functions. Their simplest forms are shown in the plot area and the expressions used to create them are shown on the y-axis.

== In topology ==
A map $f: X \to Y$ is said to be monotone if each of its fibers is connected; that is, for each element $y \in Y,$ the (possibly empty) set $f^{-1}(y)$ is a connected subspace of $X.$

== In functional analysis ==
In functional analysis on a topological vector space $X$, a (possibly non-linear) operator $T: X \rightarrow X^*$ is said to be a monotone operator if

$$(Tu - Tv, u - v) \geq 0 \quad \forall u,v \in X.$$
Kachurovskii's theorem shows that convex functions on Banach spaces have monotonic operators as their derivatives.

A subset $G$ of $X \times X^*$ is said to be a monotone set if for every pair $[u_1, w_1]$ and $[u_2, w_2]$ in $G$,

$$(w_1 - w_2, u_1 - u_2) \geq 0.$$
$G$ is said to be maximal monotone if it is maximal among all monotone sets in the sense of set inclusion. The graph of a monotone operator $G(T)$ is a monotone set. A monotone operator is said to be maximal monotone if its graph is a maximal monotone set.

== In order theory ==
Order theory deals with arbitrary partially ordered sets and preordered sets as a generalization of real numbers. The above definition of monotonicity is relevant in these cases as well. However, the terms "increasing" and "decreasing" are avoided, since their conventional pictorial representation does not apply to orders that are not total. Furthermore, the strict relations $<$ and $>$ are of little use in many non-total orders and hence no additional terminology is introduced for them.

Letting $\leq$ denote the partial order relation of any partially ordered set, a monotone function, also called isotone, or order-preserving, satisfies the property

$$x \leq y \implies f(x) \leq f(y)$$

for all x and y in its domain. The composite of two monotone mappings is also monotone.

The dual notion is often called antitone, anti-monotone, or order-reversing. Hence, an antitone function f satisfies the property

$$x \leq y \implies f(y) \leq f(x),$$

for all x and y in its domain.

A constant function is both monotone and antitone; conversely, if f is both monotone and antitone, and if the domain of f is a lattice, then f must be constant.

Monotone functions are central in order theory. They appear in most articles on the subject and examples from special applications are found in these places. Some notable special monotone functions are order embeddings (functions for which $x \leq y$ if and only if $f(x) \leq f(y))$ and order isomorphisms (surjective order embeddings).

== In the context of search algorithms ==
In the context of search algorithms monotonicity (also called consistency) is a condition applied to heuristic functions. A heuristic $h(n)$ is monotonic if, for every node n and every successor n' of n generated by any action a, the estimated cost of reaching the goal from n is no greater than the step cost of getting to n' plus the estimated cost of reaching the goal from n',

$$h(n) \leq c\left(n, a, n'\right) + h\left(n'\right) .$$

This is a form of triangle inequality, with n, n', and the goal G_{n} closest to n. Because every monotonic heuristic is also admissible, monotonicity is a stricter requirement than admissibility. Some heuristic algorithms such as A* can be proven optimal provided that the heuristic they use is monotonic.

== In Boolean functions ==
With the nonmonotonic function "if a then both b and c", false nodes appear above true nodes.

Hasse diagram of the monotonic function "at least two of a, b, c hold". Colors indicate function output values.

In Boolean algebra, a monotonic function is one such that for all a_{i} and b_{i} in {0,1}, if a_{1} ≤ b_{1}, a_{2} ≤ b_{2}, ..., a_{n} ≤ b_{n} (i.e. the Cartesian product {0, 1}^{n} is ordered coordinatewise), then f(a_{1}, ..., a_{n}) ≤ f(b_{1}, ..., b_{n}). In other words, a Boolean function is monotonic if, for every combination of inputs, switching one of the inputs from false to true can only cause the output to switch from false to true and not from true to false. Graphically, this means that an n-ary Boolean function is monotonic when its representation as an n-cube labelled with truth values has no upward edge from true to false. (This labelled Hasse diagram is the dual of the function's labelled Venn diagram, which is the more common representation for n ≤ 3.)

The monotonic Boolean functions are precisely those that can be defined by an expression combining the inputs (which may appear more than once) using only the operators and and or (in particular not is forbidden). For instance "at least two of a, b, c hold" (the ternary majority function) is a monotonic function of a, b, c, since it can be written for instance as ((a and b) or (a and c) or (b and c)).

The number of such functions on n variables is known as the Dedekind number of n.

SAT solving, generally an NP-hard task, can be achieved efficiently when all involved functions and predicates are monotonic and Boolean.

== See also ==
- Monotone cubic interpolation
- Pseudo-monotone operator
- Spearman's rank correlation coefficient - measure of monotonicity in a set of data
- Total monotonicity
- Cyclical monotonicity
- Operator monotone function
- Monotone set function
- Absolutely and completely monotonic functions and sequences

== Bibliography ==
- Bartle, Robert G. (1976). The elements of real analysis (second ed.).
- Grätzer, George (1971). Lattice theory: first concepts and distributive lattices. W. H. Freeman. ISBN 0-7167-0442-0.
- Pemberton, Malcolm; Rau, Nicholas (2001). Mathematics for economists: an introductory textbook. Manchester University Press. ISBN 0-7190-3341-1.
- Renardy, Michael & Rogers, Robert C. (2004). An introduction to partial differential equations. Texts in Applied Mathematics 13 (Second ed.). New York: Springer-Verlag. p. 356. ISBN 0-387-00444-0.
- Riesz, Frigyes & Béla Szőkefalvi-Nagy (1990). Functional Analysis. Courier Dover Publications. ISBN 978-0-486-66289-3.
- Russell, Stuart J.; Norvig, Peter (2010). Artificial Intelligence: A Modern Approach (3rd ed.). Upper Saddle River, New Jersey: Prentice Hall. ISBN 978-0-13-604259-4.
- Simon, Carl P.; Blume, Lawrence (April 1994). Mathematics for Economists (first ed.). Norton. ISBN 978-0-393-95733-4. (Definition 9.31)
