= Persymmetric matrix =

Square matrix symmetric about its anti-diagonal

In mathematics, persymmetric matrix may refer to:

1. a square matrix which is symmetric with respect to the northeast-to-southwest diagonal (anti-diagonal); or
2. a square matrix such that the values on each line perpendicular to the main diagonal are the same for a given line.

The first definition is the most common in the recent literature. The designation "Hankel matrix" is often used for matrices satisfying the property in the second definition.

== Definition 1 ==
Symmetry pattern of a persymmetric 5 × 5 matrix

Let A = (a_{ij}) be an n × n matrix. The first definition of persymmetric requires that
$$a_{ij} = a_{n-j+1,\,n-i+1}$$
for all i, j. For example, 5 × 5 persymmetric matrices are of the form
$$A = \begin{bmatrix}
a_{11} & a_{12} & a_{13} & a_{14} & a_{15} \\
a_{21} & a_{22} & a_{23} & a_{24} & a_{14} \\
a_{31} & a_{32} & a_{33} & a_{23} & a_{13} \\
a_{41} & a_{42} & a_{32} & a_{22} & a_{12} \\
a_{51} & a_{41} & a_{31} & a_{21} & a_{11}
\end{bmatrix}.$$

This can be equivalently expressed as AJ = JA^{T} where J is the exchange matrix.

A third way to express this is seen by post-multiplying AJ = JA^{T} with J on both sides, showing that A^{T} rotated 180 degrees is identical to A:
$$A = J A^\mathsf{T} J.$$

A symmetric matrix is a matrix whose values are symmetric in the northwest-to-southeast diagonal. If a symmetric matrix is rotated by 90°, it becomes a persymmetric matrix. Symmetric persymmetric matrices are sometimes called bisymmetric matrices.

== Definition 2 ==
The second definition is due to Thomas Muir. It says that the square matrix A = (a_{ij}) is persymmetric if a_{ij} depends only on i + j. Persymmetric matrices in this sense, or Hankel matrices as they are often called, are of the form
$$A = \begin{bmatrix}
r_1 & r_2 & r_3 & \cdots & r_n \\
r_2 & r_3 & r_4 & \cdots & r_{n+1} \\
r_3 & r_4 & r_5 & \cdots & r_{n+2} \\
\vdots & \vdots & \vdots & \ddots & \vdots \\
r_n & r_{n+1} & r_{n+2} & \cdots & r_{2n-1}
\end{bmatrix}.$$
A persymmetric determinant is the determinant of a persymmetric matrix.

A matrix for which the values on each line parallel to the main diagonal are constant is called a Toeplitz matrix.

== See also ==
- Centrosymmetric matrix
