= Moment problem =

Trying to map moments to a measure that generates them

Example: Given the mean and variance $\sigma^2$ (as well as all further cumulants equal 0) the normal distribution is the distribution solving the moment problem.

In mathematics, a moment problem arises as the result of trying to invert the mapping that takes a measure $\mu$ to the sequence of moments

$$m_n = \int_{-\infty}^\infty x^n \,d\mu(x)\,.$$

More generally, one may consider

$$m_n = \int_{-\infty}^\infty M_n(x) \,d\mu(x)\,.$$

for an arbitrary sequence of functions $M_n$.

== Introduction ==
In the classical setting, $\mu$ is a measure on the real line, and $M$ is the sequence $\{x^n : n=1,2,\dotsc\}$. In this form the question appears in probability theory, asking whether there is a probability measure having specified mean, variance and so on, and whether it is unique.

There are three named classical moment problems: the Hamburger moment problem in which the support of $\mu$ is allowed to be the whole real line; the Stieltjes moment problem, for $[0,\infty)$; and the Hausdorff moment problem for a bounded interval, which without loss of generality may be taken as $[0,1]$.

The moment problem also extends to complex analysis as the trigonometric moment problem in which the Hankel matrices are replaced by Toeplitz matrices and the support of μ is the complex unit circle instead of the real line.

== Existence ==
A sequence of numbers $m_n$ is the sequence of moments of a measure $\mu$ if and only if a certain positivity condition is fulfilled; namely, the Hankel matrices $H_n$,

$$(H_n)_{ij} = m_{i+j}\,,$$

should be positive semi-definite. This is because a positive-semidefinite Hankel matrix corresponds to a linear functional $\Lambda$ such that $\Lambda(x^n) = m_n$ and $\Lambda(f^2) \geq 0$ (non-negative for sum of squares of polynomials). Assume $\Lambda$ can be extended to $\mathbb{R}[x]^*$. In the univariate case, a non-negative polynomial can always be written as a sum of squares. So the linear functional $\Lambda$ is positive for all the non-negative polynomials in the univariate case. By Haviland's theorem, the linear functional has a measure form, that is $\Lambda(x^n) = \int_{-\infty}^{\infty} x^n d \mu$. A condition of similar form is necessary and sufficient for the existence of a measure $\mu$ supported on a given interval $[a,b]$.

One way to prove these results is to consider the linear functional $\varphi$ that sends a polynomial

$$P(x) = \sum_k a_k x^k$$

to

$$\sum_k a_k m_k.$$

If $m_k$ are the moments of some measure $\mu$ supported on $[a,b]$, then evidently

$\varphi(P) \ge 0$ for any polynomial $P$ that is non-negative on $[a,b]$.	1

Vice versa, if (1) holds, one can apply the M. Riesz extension theorem and extend $\varphi$ to a functional on the space of continuous functions with compact support $C_c([a,b])$), so that

$\varphi(f) \ge 0$ for any $f \in C_c([a,b]),\;f\ge 0.$	2

By the Riesz representation theorem, (2) holds iff there exists a measure $\mu$ supported on $[a,b]$, such that

$$\varphi(f) = \int f \, d\mu$$

for every $f \in C_c([a,b])$.

Thus the existence of the measure $\mu$ is equivalent to (1). Using a representation theorem for positive polynomials on $[a,b]$, one can reformulate (1) as a condition on Hankel matrices.

== Uniqueness (or determinacy) ==
The uniqueness of $\mu$ in the Hausdorff moment problem follows from the Weierstrass approximation theorem, which states that polynomials are dense under the uniform norm in the space of continuous functions on $[0,1]$. For the problem on an infinite interval, uniqueness is a more delicate question. There are distributions, such as log-normal distributions, which have finite moments for all the positive integers but where other distributions have the same moments.

== Formal solution ==
When the solution exists, it can be formally written using derivatives of the Dirac delta function as

$$d\mu(x) = \rho(x) dx, \quad \rho(x) = \sum_{n=0}^\infty \frac{(-1)^n}{n!}\delta^{(n)}(x)m_n$$.

The expression can be derived by taking the inverse Fourier transform of its characteristic function.

== Variations ==
An important variation is the truncated moment problem, which studies the properties of measures with fixed first k moments (for a finite k). Results on the truncated moment problem have numerous applications to extremal problems, optimisation and limit theorems in probability theory.

== Probability ==
The moment problem has applications to probability theory. The following is commonly used:

Theorem (Fréchet-Shohat)—If $\mu$ is a determinate measure (i.e. its moments determine it uniquely), and the measures $\mu_n$ are such that
$$\forall k \geq 0 \quad \lim _{n \rightarrow \infty} m_k\left[\mu_n\right]=m_k[\mu],$$
then $\mu_n \rightarrow \mu$ in distribution.

By checking Carleman's condition, we know that the standard normal distribution is a determinate measure, thus we have the following form of the central limit theorem:

Corollary—If a sequence of probability distributions $\nu_n$ satisfy
$$m_{2k}[\nu_n] \to \frac{(2k)!}{2^k k!}; \quad m_{2k+1}[\nu_n] \to 0$$
then $\nu_n$ converges to $N(0, 1)$ in distribution.

== See also ==
- Carleman's condition
- Hamburger moment problem
- Hankel matrix
- Hausdorff moment problem
- Moment (mathematics)
- Stieltjes moment problem
- Trigonometric moment problem
