= Schur function =

A Schur function may be:

- A Schur polynomial
- A holomorphic function in the Schur class
