= Schur algorithm =

In mathematics, the Schur algorithm may be:

- The Schur algorithm for expanding a function in the Schur class as a continued fraction
- The Lehmer–Schur algorithm for finding complex roots of a polynomial
