= Samuel Verblunsky =

British mathematician

Samuel Verblunsky (22 June 1906, London - 1996, Belfast) was a British mathematician who introduced Verblunsky's theorem and Verblunsky coefficients. His early work on orthogonal polynomials and harmonic functions was neglected for many years, until publicized by Barry Simon.

== Career ==
Verblunsky's entered Magdalene College, Cambridge in 1924 having won a scholarship to study mathematics. His teachers at Cambridge included G H Hardy and J E Littlewood, while fellow students included Donald Coxeter and Raymond Paley. He got his PhD at Cambridge in 1930 under John Littlewood, and spend the rest of the 1930s at the University of Manchester. He then worked for three decades at Queen's University Belfast, where he rose to the rank of dean.

== Publications ==
- 1935 On positive harmonic functions. A contribution to the algebra of Fourier series Oxford Journals: Science & Mathematics: Proceedings London Mathematical Society, Vol s2-38, Issue 1, pp. 125–157.
- 1936 On positive harmonic functions (second paper) Oxford Journals: Science & Mathematics: Proceedings London Mathematical Society, Vol s2-40, Issue 1, pp. 290–320
- 1939 An Introduction to the Theory of Functions of a Real Variable, Oxford University Press, 1939, MR 0000655
