= Szegő polynomial =

In mathematics, a Szegő polynomial is a family of orthogonal polynomials on the unit circle for the Hermitian inner product

$$\langle f|g\rangle = \int_{|z|=1}\overline{f(z)}g(z)\,d\mu(z)$$

where dμ(z) is a given positive measure on the unit circle. Writing $\phi_n(z)$ for the polynomials, they obey a recurrence relation

$$\phi_{n+1}(z)=z\phi_n(z) - \overline{\alpha_n}\phi_n^*(z)$$

where $\phi_0=1$ and $\alpha_n$ is a parameter, called the reflection coefficient or the Szegő parameter and $\phi_n^*(z) = z^n\overline{\phi_n(z)}$. For more details see orthogonal polynomials on the unit circle

== See also ==
- Cayley transform
- Schur class
- Favard's theorem
