= Rogers–Szegő polynomials =

In mathematics, the Rogers–Szegő polynomials are a family of orthogonal polynomials on the unit circle introduced by Gábor Szegő, who was inspired by the continuous q-Hermite polynomials studied by Leonard James Rogers. They are given by

$$h_n(x;q) = \sum_{k=0}^n\frac{(q;q)_n}{(q;q)_k(q;q)_{n-k}}x^k,$$

where $(q;q)_n$ is the descending q-Pochhammer symbol. The Rogers-Szegő polynomials satisfy the recurrence relation

$$h_{n+1}(x;q) = (1+x)h_n(x;q) + x(q^n-1)h_{n-1}(x;q)$$

with $h_0(x;q)=1$ and $h_1(x;q)=1+x$.
