= Wiener's lemma =

In mathematics, Wiener's lemma is a well-known identity which relates the asymptotic behaviour of the Fourier coefficients of a Borel measure on the circle to its discrete part. This result admits an analogous statement for measures on the real line. It was first discovered by Norbert Wiener.

== Definition ==
Consider the space $M(\mathbb{T})$ of all (finite) complex Borel measures on the unit circle $\mathbb T$ and the space $C(\mathbb{T})$ of continuous functions on $\mathbb T$ as its dual space. Then $C(\mathbb{T}) \sub L^p(\mathbb{T})$ for all $1 \leq p < \infty$ and $L^1(\mathbb{T}) \sub M(\mathbb{T})$.

Given $\mu \in M(\mathbb{T})$, let
$$\mu_{pp}=\sum_j c_j\delta_{z_j},$$
be its discrete part (meaning that $\mu(\{z_j\})=c_j\neq 0$ and $\mu(\{z\})=0$ for $z\not\in\{z_j\}$. Then
$$\lim_{N\to\infty}\frac{1}{2N+1}\sum_{n=-N}^N|\widehat\mu(n)|^2=\sum_j|c_j|^2,$$
where $\widehat{\mu}(n)=\int_{\mathbb T}z^{-n}\,d\mu(z)$ is the $n$-th Fourier-Stieltjes coefficient of $\mu$.

Similarly, on the real line $\mathbb R$, the space $M(\mathbb{R})$ is the dual space of $C_{0}(\mathbb{R})$, continuous functions which vanish at infinity, and $C_{0}(\mathbb{R})\subset L^p(\mathbb{R})$ for all $1 \leq p \leq \infty$.

Given $\mu \in M(\mathbb{R})$, let
$$\mu_{pp}=\sum_j c_j\delta_{x_j},$$
its discrete part. Then
$$\lim_{R\to\infty}\frac{1}{2R}\int_{-R}^R|\widehat\mu(\xi)|^2\,d\xi=\sum_j|c_j|^2,$$
where $\widehat{\mu}(\xi)=\int_{\mathbb R}e^{-2\pi i\xi x}\,d\mu(x)$ is the Fourier-Stieltjes transform of $\mu$.

=== Consequences ===
If $\mu \in M(\mathbb{T})$ is continuous, then
$$\lim_{N\to\infty}\frac{1}{2N+1}\sum_{n=-N}^N|\widehat\mu(n)|^2=0.$$
Furthermore, $\hat{\mu}$ tends to zero if $\mu$ is absolutely continuous. Equivalently, $\mu$ is absolutely continuous if its Fourier-Stieltjes sequence belongs to the sequence space $\ell^2$. That is, if $\mu$ places no mass on the sets of Lebesgue measure zero (i.e. $\mu_{pp}=0$), then $\hat{\mu}\to 0$ as $|N| \to \infty$. Conversely, if $\hat{\mu}\to 0$ as $|N| \to \infty$, then $\mu$ places no mass on the countable sets.

A probability measure $\mu$ on the circle is a Dirac mass if and only if
$$\lim_{N\to\infty}\frac{1}{2N+1}\sum_{n=-N}^N|\widehat\mu(n)|^2=1.$$
Here, the nontrivial implication follows from the fact that the weights $c_j$ are positive and satisfy
$$1=\sum_j c_j^2\le\sum_j c_j\le 1,$$
which forces $c_j^2=c_j$ and thus $c_j=1$, so that there must be a single atom with mass $1$.

== Proof ==
- First of all, we observe that if $\nu$ is a complex measure on the circle then

$$\frac{1}{2N+1}\sum_{n=-N}^N\widehat{\nu}(n)=\int_{\mathbb T}f_N(z)\,d\nu(z),$$

with $f_N(z)=\frac{1}{2N+1}\sum_{n=-N}^N z^{-n}$. The function $f_N$ is bounded by $1$ in absolute value and has $f_N(1)=1$, while $f_N(z)=\frac{z^{N+1}-z^{-N}}{(2N+1)(z-1)}$ for $z\in\mathbb{T}\setminus\{1\}$, which converges to $0$ as $N\to\infty$. Hence, by the dominated convergence theorem,

$$\lim_{N\to\infty}\frac{1}{2N+1}\sum_{n=-N}^N\widehat{\nu}(n)=\int_{\mathbb T}1_{\{1\}}(z)\,d\nu(z)=\nu(\{1\}).$$

We now take $\mu'$ to be the pushforward of $\overline\mu$ under the inverse map on $\mathbb T$, namely $\mu'(B)=\overline{\mu(B^{-1})}$ for any Borel set $B\subseteq\mathbb T$. This complex measure has Fourier coefficients $\widehat{\mu'}(n)=\overline{\widehat{\mu}(n)}$. We are going to apply the above to the convolution between $\mu$ and $\mu'$, namely we choose $\nu=\mu*\mu'$, meaning that $\nu$ is the pushforward of the measure $\mu\times\mu'$ (on $\mathbb T\times\mathbb T$) under the product map $\cdot:\mathbb{T}\times\mathbb{T}\to\mathbb{T}$. By Fubini's theorem

$$\widehat{\nu}(n)=\int_{\mathbb{T}\times\mathbb{T}}(zw)^{-n}\,d(\mu\times\mu')(z,w)
=\int_{\mathbb T}\int_{\mathbb T}z^{-n}w^{-n}\,d\mu'(w)\,d\mu(z)=\widehat{\mu}(n)\widehat{\mu'}(n)=|\widehat{\mu}(n)|^2.$$

So, by the identity derived earlier, $\lim_{N\to\infty}\frac{1}{2N+1}\sum_{n=-N}^N|\widehat{\mu}(n)|^2=\nu(\{1\})=\int_{\mathbb T\times\mathbb T}1_{\{zw=1\}}\,d(\mu\times\mu')(z,w).$ By Fubini's theorem again, the right-hand side equals

$$\int_{\mathbb T}\mu'(\{z^{-1}\})\,d\mu(z)=\int_{\mathbb T}\overline{\mu(\{z\})}\,d\mu(z)=\sum_j|\mu(\{z_j\})|^2=\sum_j|c_j|^2.$$

- The proof of the analogous statement for the real line is identical, except that we use the identity

$$\frac{1}{2R}\int_{-R}^R\widehat\nu(\xi)\,d\xi=\int_{\mathbb R}f_R(x)\,d\nu(x)$$

(which follows from Fubini's theorem), where $f_R(x)=\frac{1}{2R}\int_{-R}^R e^{-2\pi i\xi x}\,d\xi$. We observe that $|f_R|\le 1$, $f_R(0)=1$ and $f_R(x)=\frac{e^{2\pi iRx}-e^{-2\pi iRx}}{4\pi iRx}$ for $x\neq 0$, which converges to $0$ as $R\to\infty$. So, by dominated convergence, we have the analogous identity

$$\lim_{R\to\infty}\frac{1}{2R}\int_{-R}^R\widehat\nu(\xi)\,d\xi=\nu(\{0\}).$$

== See also ==
- Lebesgue's decomposition theorem
- Trigonometric moment problem
