= Cyclical monotonicity =

Mathematics concept

In mathematics, cyclical monotonicity is a generalization of the notion of monotonicity to the case of vector-valued function.

== Definition ==
Let $\langle\cdot,\cdot\rangle$ denote the inner product on an inner product space $X$ and let $U$ be a nonempty subset of $X$. A correspondence $f: U \rightrightarrows X$ is called cyclically monotone if for every set of points $x_1,\dots,x_{m+1} \in U$ with $x_{m+1}=x_1$ it holds that $\sum_{k=1}^m \langle x_{k+1},f(x_{k+1})-f(x_k)\rangle\geq 0.$

== Properties ==
For the case of scalar functions of one variable the definition above is equivalent to usual monotonicity. Gradients of convex functions are cyclically monotone. In fact, the converse is true. Suppose $U$ is convex and $f: U \rightrightarrows \mathbb{R}^n$ is a correspondence with nonempty values. Then if $f$ is cyclically monotone, there exists an upper semicontinuous convex function $F:U\to \mathbb{R}$ such that $f(x)\subset \partial F(x)$ for every $x\in U$, where $\partial F(x)$ denotes the subgradient of $F$ at $x$.

== See also ==
- Absolutely and completely monotonic functions and sequences
