= Carleman's condition =

In mathematics, particularly, in analysis, Carleman's condition gives a sufficient condition for the determinacy of the moment problem. That is, if a measure $\mu$ satisfies Carleman's condition, there is no other measure $\nu$ having the same moments as $\mu.$ The condition was discovered by Torsten Carleman in 1922.

== Hamburger moment problem ==
For the Hamburger moment problem (the moment problem on the whole real line), the theorem states the following:

Carleman's condition— Let $\mu$ be a measure on $\R$ such that all the moments
$$m_n = \int_{-\infty}^{+\infty} x^n \, d\mu(x)~, \quad n = 0,1,2,\dots$$
are finite. If
$$\sum_{n=1}^\infty m_{2n}^{-\frac{1}{2n}} = + \infty,$$
then the moment problem for $(m_n)$ is determinate; that is, $\mu$ is the only measure on $\R$ with $(m_n)$ as its sequence of moments.

== Stieltjes moment problem ==
For the Stieltjes moment problem, the sufficient condition for determinacy is
$$\sum_{n=1}^\infty m_{n}^{-\frac{1}{2n}} = + \infty.$$

== Generalized Carleman's condition ==
In Nasiraee et al. showed that, despite previous assumptions, when the integrand is an arbitrary function, Carleman's condition is not sufficient, as demonstrated by a counter-example. In fact, the example violates the bijection, i.e. determinacy, property in the probability sum theorem. When the integrand is an arbitrary function, they further establish a sufficient condition for the determinacy of the moment problem, referred to as the generalized Carleman's condition.
