= Stieltjes moment problem =

Probability problem

In mathematics, the Stieltjes moment problem, named after Thomas Joannes Stieltjes, seeks necessary and sufficient conditions for a sequence (m_{0}, m_{1}, m_{2}, ...) to be of the form

$$m_n = \int_0^\infty x^n\,d\mu(x)$$

for some measure μ. If such a function μ exists, one asks whether it is unique.

The essential difference between this and other well-known moment problems is that this is on a half-line [0, ∞), whereas in the Hausdorff moment problem one considers a bounded interval [0, 1], and in the Hamburger moment problem one considers the whole line (−∞, ∞).

== Existence ==
Let

$$\Delta_n=\left[\begin{matrix}
m_0 & m_1 & m_2 & \cdots & m_{n}    \\
m_1 & m_2 & m_3 & \cdots & m_{n+1} \\
m_2& m_3 & m_4 & \cdots & m_{n+2} \\
\vdots & \vdots & \vdots & \ddots & \vdots \\
m_{n} & m_{n+1} & m_{n+2} & \cdots & m_{2n}
\end{matrix}\right]$$

be a Hankel matrix, and

$$\Delta_n^{(1)}=\left[\begin{matrix}
m_1 & m_2 & m_3 & \cdots & m_{n+1}    \\
m_2 & m_3 & m_4 & \cdots & m_{n+2} \\
m_3 & m_4 & m_5 & \cdots & m_{n+3} \\
\vdots & \vdots & \vdots & \ddots & \vdots \\
m_{n+1} & m_{n+2} & m_{n+3} & \cdots & m_{2n+1}
\end{matrix}\right].$$

Then { m_{n} : n = 1, 2, 3, ... } is a moment sequence of some measure on $[0,\infty)$ with infinite support if and only if for all n, both

$$\det(\Delta_n) > 0\ \mathrm{and}\ \det\left(\Delta_n^{(1)}\right) > 0.$$

{ m_{n} : n = 1, 2, 3, ... } is a moment sequence of some measure on $[0,\infty)$ with finite support of size m if and only if for all $n \leq m$, both

$$\det(\Delta_n) > 0\ \mathrm{and}\ \det\left(\Delta_n^{(1)}\right) > 0$$

and for all larger $n$

$$\det(\Delta_n) = 0\ \mathrm{and}\ \det\left(\Delta_n^{(1)}\right) = 0.$$

== Uniqueness ==
There are several sufficient conditions for uniqueness.

Carleman's condition: The solution is unique if

$$\sum_{n \geq 1} m_n^{-1/(2n)} = \infty~.$$

Hardy's criterion: If $\mu$ is a probability distribution supported on $[0, \infty)$, such that $\mathbb E_{X \sim \mu}[e^{c\sqrt{X}}] < \infty$, then all its moments are finite, and $\mu$ is the unique distribution with these moments.
