= Leonard James Rogers =

British mathematician (1862–1933)

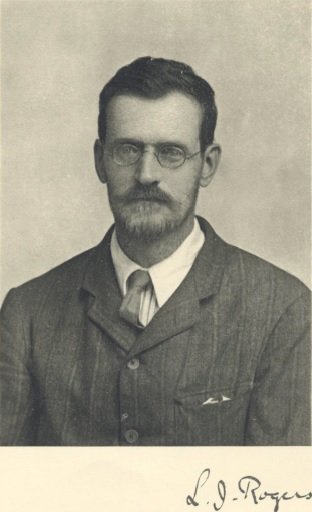
Leonard James Rogers

Leonard James Rogers FRS (30 March 1862 – 12 September 1933) was a British mathematician who was the first to discover the Rogers–Ramanujan identity and Hölder's inequality, and who introduced Rogers polynomials. The Rogers–Szegő polynomials are named after him.

== Early life and education ==
Rogers was born in Oxford, the second son of James Edwin Thorold Rogers and his second wife Anne Reynolds, and brother of Annie Rogers. He matriculated at Balliol College, Oxford, graduating BA and BMus in 1884 and MA in 1887.

== Academic career ==
Rogers became lecturer in mathematics at Wadham College, Oxford in 1885.

In 1888 Rogers was appointed Professor of Mathematics at the Yorkshire College, by then a constituent college of the Victoria University. The Yorkshire College became the University of Leeds in 1904. In 1919 he retired because of poor health.

Rogers worked initially on reciprocants in the theory of differential invariants, and then moved into the area of special functions, where he anticipated results of Ramanujan. In the late 1920s, he published in the Mathematical Gazette four notes on geometrical problems, including on Malfatti's Problem.

== Honours ==
He was elected a Fellow of the Royal Society (FRS) in 1924.

== Death ==
Rogers died in Oxford on 12 September 1933, aged 71.

== Publications ==
- Rogers, L. J. (February 1888), "An extension of a certain theorem in inequalities", Messenger of Mathematics, New Series, XVII (10): 145–150, JFM 20.0254.02, archived from the original on 21 August 2007. The first paper containing Hölder's inequality.
- Rogers, L. J. (12 April 1894), "Second Memoir on the Expansion of certain Infinite Products", Proceedings of the London Mathematical Society, s1, 25 (1): 318–343, doi:10.1112/plms/s1-25.1.318, JFM 25.0432.01. The first paper containing the Rogers–Ramanujan identities.
