= Joseph L. Ullman =

American mathematician (1923-1995)

Joseph Leonard Ullman (30 January 1923, in Buffalo, New York – 11 September 1995, in Chelsea, Michigan) was a mathematician who worked on classical analysis with a focus on approximation theory.

Ullman received his A.B. from the University of Buffalo and his graduate studies were interrupted by service in the U.S. Army in World War II. He was injured, received a Purple Heart, and spent the rest of the war as a mathematics instructor. He received a Ph.D. in 1949 from Stanford University with thesis Studies on Faber Polynomials under the direction of Gábor Szegő. Ullman became an instructor at the University of Michigan in 1949, an assistant professor in 1954, an associate professor in 1962, and a professor in 1966.

He wrote forty-three research papers. During his career at the University of Michigan he supervised eleven doctoral theses.

== Selected works ==
- Ullman, Joseph L. (1960). "Studies in Faber polynomials. I". Trans. Amer. Math. Soc. 94 (3): 515–528. doi:10.1090/s0002-9947-1960-0112955-2. MR 0112955.
- Ullman, J. L. (1963). "Tchebycheff quadrature on the infinite interval". Trans. Amer. Math. Soc. 107 (2): 291–299. doi:10.1090/s0002-9947-1963-0147817-0. MR 0147817.
- Ullman, J. L. (1966). "A class of weight functions for which Tchebycheff quadrature is possible". Bull. Amer. Math. Soc. 72 (6): 1073–1075. doi:10.1090/s0002-9904-1966-11651-8. MR 0204931.
- with R. C. Lyndon: Lyndon, R. C.; Ullman, J. L. (1967). "Groups of elliptic linear fractional transformations". Proc. Amer. Math. Soc. 18 (6): 1119–1124. doi:10.1090/s0002-9939-1967-0222182-8. MR 0222182.
- Ullman, J. L. (1972). "The location of the zeros of the derivatives of Faber polynomials". Proc. Amer. Math. Soc. 34 (2): 422–424. doi:10.1090/s0002-9939-1972-0299761-7. MR 0299761.
- Ullman, J. L. (1972). "On the regular behaviour of orthogonal polynomials" (PDF). Proc. London Math. Soc. 24 (3): 119–148. doi:10.1112/plms/s3-24.1.119. hdl:2027.42/135623.
- Ullman, J. L. (1980). "Orthogonal polynomials associated with an infinite interval". Michigan Math. J. 27 (3): 353–363. doi:10.1307/mmj/1029002408. MR 0584699.
- with Matthew F. Wyneken: Ullman, J. L.; Wyneken, M. F. (1986). "Weak limits of zeros of orthogonal polynomials" (PDF). Constr. Approx. 2 (4): 339–347. doi:10.1007/bf01893436. hdl:2027.42/41341. MR 0892160. S2CID 39657045.
- with Vilmos Totik: Totik, Vilmos; Ullman, Joseph L. (1994). "Local asymptotic distribution of zeros of orthogonal polynomials". Trans. Amer. Math. Soc. 341 (2): 881–894. doi:10.1090/s0002-9947-1994-1150019-2. MR 1150019.
