= Szegő limit theorems =

Determinant of large Toeplitz matrices

In mathematical analysis, the Szegő limit theorems describe the asymptotic behaviour of the determinants of large Toeplitz matrices. They were first proved by Gábor Szegő.

== Notation ==
Let $w$ be a Fourier series with Fourier coefficients $c_k$, relating to each other as

$$w(\theta) = \sum_{k=-\infty}^{\infty}  c_k e^{i k \theta}, \qquad \theta \in [0,2\pi],$$
$$c_k = \frac{1}{2\pi} \int_0^{2\pi} w(\theta) e^{-ik\theta} \, d\theta,$$

such that the $n\times n$ Toeplitz matrices $T_n(w) = \left(c_{k-l}\right)_{0\leq k,l \leq n-1}$ are Hermitian, i.e., $T_n(w)=T_n(w)^\ast$, or equivalently $c_{-k}=\overline{c_k}$. Then both $w$ and the eigenvalues $(\lambda_m^{(n)})_{0\leq m \leq n-1}$ of $T_n(w)$ are real-valued and the determinant of $T_n(w)$ is given by

$$\det T_n(w) = \prod_{m=1}^{n-1} \lambda_m^{(n)}$$.

== Szegő theorem ==
Under suitable assumptions the Szegő theorem states that

$$\lim_{n\rightarrow \infty}\frac{1}{n} \sum_{m=0}^{n-1}F(\lambda_m^{(n)}) = \frac{1}{2\pi} \int_0^{2\pi} F(w(\theta))\, d\theta$$

for any function $F$ that is continuous on the range of $w$. In particular

| $\lim_{n\rightarrow \infty}\frac{1}{n} \sum_{m=0}^{n-1}\lambda_m^{(n)} = \frac{1}{2\pi} \int_0^{2\pi} w(\theta)\, d\theta < \infty$ | 1 |

i.e. the arithmetic mean of $\lambda^{(n)}$ converges to the integral of $w$, i.e. $c_0$.

=== First Szegő theorem ===
The first Szegő theorem states that, if right-hand side of (1) holds and $w \geq 0$, then

| $\lim_{n \to \infty} \left(\det T_n(w)\right)^{\frac{1}{n}} = \lim_{n \to \infty} \frac{\det T_n(w)}{\det T_{n-1}(w)} = \exp \left( \frac{1}{2\pi} \int_0^{2\pi} \log w(\theta) \, d\theta \right)$ | 2 |

holds for $w > 0$ and $w\in L^1$. The RHS of (2) is the geometric mean of $w$ (well-defined by the arithmetic-geometric mean inequality).

=== Second Szegő theorem ===
Let $\widehat c_k$ be the Fourier coefficient of $\log w \in L^{1}$, written as

$$\widehat c_k = \frac{1}{2\pi} \int_0^{2\pi} \log (w(\theta)) e^{-ik\theta} \, d\theta$$

The second (or strong) Szegő theorem states that, if $w \geq 0$, then

$$\lim_{n \to \infty} \frac{\det T_n(w)}{e^{(n+1) \widehat c_0}}
= \exp \left( \sum_{k=1}^\infty k \left| \widehat c_k\right|^2 \right).$$

== See also ==
- Trigonometric moment problem
- Verblunsky's theorem
