= Exchange matrix =

Square matrix whose entries are 1 along the anti-diagonal and 0 elsewhere

In mathematics, especially linear algebra, the exchange matrices (also called the reversal matrix, backward identity, or standard involutory permutation) are special cases of permutation matrices, where the 1 elements reside on the antidiagonal and all other elements are zero. In other words, they are 'row-reversed' or 'column-reversed' versions of the identity matrix.

$$\begin{align}
J_2 &= \begin{pmatrix}
0 & 1 \\
1 & 0
\end{pmatrix} \\[4pt]
J_3 &= \begin{pmatrix}
0 & 0 & 1 \\
0 & 1 & 0 \\
1 & 0 & 0
\end{pmatrix} \\
&\quad \vdots \\[2pt]
J_n &= \begin{pmatrix}
0      & 0      & \cdots      & 0      & 1      \\
0      & 0      & \cdots      & 1      & 0      \\
\vdots & \vdots & \,{}_{_{\displaystyle\cdot}} \!\, {}^{_{_{\displaystyle\cdot}}} \! \dot\phantom{j} & \vdots & \vdots \\
0      & 1      & \cdots      & 0      & 0      \\
1      & 0      & \cdots      & 0      & 0
\end{pmatrix}
\end{align}$$

== Definition ==
If J is an n × n exchange matrix, then the elements of J are
$$J_{i,j} = \begin{cases}
1, & i + j = n + 1 \\
0, & i + j \ne n + 1\\
\end{cases}$$

== Properties ==
- Premultiplying a matrix by an exchange matrix flips vertically the positions of the former's rows, i.e.,
  $$\begin{pmatrix}
0 & 0 & 1 \\
0 & 1 & 0 \\
1 & 0 & 0
\end{pmatrix}
\begin{pmatrix}
1 & 2 & 3 \\
4 & 5 & 6 \\
7 & 8 & 9
\end{pmatrix} =
\begin{pmatrix}
7 & 8 & 9 \\
4 & 5 & 6 \\
1 & 2 & 3
\end{pmatrix}.$$
- Postmultiplying a matrix by an exchange matrix flips horizontally the positions of the former's columns, i.e.,
  $$\begin{pmatrix}
1 & 2 & 3 \\
4 & 5 & 6 \\
7 & 8 & 9
\end{pmatrix}
\begin{pmatrix}
0 & 0 & 1 \\
0 & 1 & 0 \\
1 & 0 & 0
\end{pmatrix} =
\begin{pmatrix}
3 & 2 & 1 \\
6 & 5 & 4 \\
9 & 8 & 7
\end{pmatrix}.$$
- Exchange matrices are symmetric; that is:
  $$J_n^\mathsf{T} = J_n.$$
- For any integer k:
  $$J_n^k = \begin{cases}
I & \text{ if } k \text{ is even,} \\[2pt]
J_n & \text{ if } k \text{ is odd.}
\end{cases}$$
  In particular, J_{n} is an involutory matrix; that is,
  $$J_n^{-1} = J_n.$$
- The trace of J_{n} is 1 if n is odd and 0 if n is even. In other words:
  $$\operatorname{tr}(J_n) = \frac{1-(-1)^n}{2} = n\bmod 2.$$
- The determinant of J_{n} is:
  $$\det(J_n) = (-1)^{\lfloor n/2\rfloor} = (-1)^\frac{n(n-1)}{2}$$
  As a function of n, it has period 4, giving 1, 1, −1, −1 when n is congruent modulo 4 to 0, 1, 2, and 3 respectively.
- The characteristic polynomial of J_{n} is:
  $$\det(\lambda I- J_n) = (\lambda -1)^{\lceil n/2\rceil}(\lambda +1)^{\lfloor n/2\rfloor}=
\begin{cases}
\big[(\lambda+1)(\lambda-1)\big]^\frac{n}{2} & \text{ if } n \text{ is even,} \\[4pt]
(\lambda-1)^\frac{n+1}{2}(\lambda+1)^\frac{n-1}{2} & \text{ if } n \text{ is odd,}
\end{cases}$$

its eigenvalues are 1 (with multiplicity $\lceil n/2\rceil$) and -1 (with multiplicity $\lfloor n/2\rfloor$).

- The adjugate matrix of J_{n} is:
  $$\operatorname{adj}(J_n) = \sgn(\pi_n)  J_n.$$
  (where sgn is the sign of the permutation π_{k} of k elements).

== Relationships ==
- An exchange matrix is the simplest anti-diagonal matrix.
- Any matrix A satisfying the condition AJ = JA is said to be centrosymmetric.
- Any matrix A satisfying the condition AJ = JA^{T} is said to be persymmetric.
- Symmetric matrices A that satisfy the condition AJ = JA are called bisymmetric matrices. Bisymmetric matrices are both centrosymmetric and persymmetric.

== See also ==
- Pauli matrices (the first Pauli matrix is a 2 × 2 exchange matrix)
