= Absolutely and completely monotonic functions and sequences =

In mathematics, the notions of an absolutely monotonic function and a completely monotonic function are two very closely related concepts. Both imply very strong monotonicity properties. Both types of functions have derivatives of all orders. In the case of an absolutely monotonic function, the function as well as its derivatives of all orders must be non-negative in its domain of definition which would imply that the function as well as its derivatives of all orders are monotonically increasing functions in the domain of definition. In the case of a completely monotonic function, the function and its derivatives must be alternately non-negative and non-positive in its domain of definition which would imply that function and its derivatives are alternately monotonically increasing and monotonically decreasing functions.

Such functions were first studied by S. Bernstein in 1914 and the terminology is also due to him. There are several other related notions like the concepts of almost completely monotonic function, logarithmically completely monotonic function, strongly logarithmically completely monotonic function, strongly completely monotonic function and almost strongly completely monotonic function. Another related concept is that of a completely/absolutely monotonic sequence. This notion was introduced by Hausdorff in 1921.

The notions of completely and absolutely monotonic function/sequence play an important role in several areas of mathematics. For example, in classical analysis they occur in the proof of the positivity of integrals involving Bessel functions or the positivity of Cesàro means of certain Jacobi series. Such functions occur in other areas of mathematics such as probability theory, numerical analysis, and elasticity.

== Absolutely and completely monotonic functions ==
=== Definitions ===
A real valued function $f(x)$ defined over an interval $I$ in the real line is called an absolutely monotonic function if it has derivatives $f^{(n)}(x)$ of all orders $n=0,1,2,\ldots$ and $f^{(n)}(x) \ge 0$ for all $x$ in $I$. The function $f(x)$ is called a completely monotonic function if $(-1)^nf^{(n)}(x) \ge 0$ for all $x$ in $I$.

The two notions are mutually related. The function $f(x)$ is completely monotonic if and only if $f(-x)$ is absolutely monotonic on $-I$ where $-I$ the interval obtained by reflecting $I$ with respect to the origin. (Thus, if $I$ is the interval $(a,b)$ then $-I$ is the interval $(-b,-a)$.)

In applications, the interval on the real line that is usually considered is the closed-open right half of the real line, that is, the interval $[0, \infty)$.

Sometimes, especially when defining completely monotonic functions on semigroups, they are defined as functions $f$ such that $\nabla_{a_1} \ldots \nabla_{a_n} f \geq 0$ for all sequences $a_1, \ldots, a_n \geq 0$ for all $n \in \mathbb{N}$ where $\nabla_a$ is the finite difference operator defined by $(\nabla_a f) (x) = f(x) - f(x+a)$.

=== Examples ===
The following functions are absolutely monotonic in the specified regions.

1. $f(x)=c$, where $c$ a non-negative constant, in the region $-\infty <x < \infty$
2. $f(x) = \sum_{k=0}^\infty a_k x^k$, where $a_k\ge 0$ for all $k$, in the region $0\le x < \infty$
3. $f(x) = \exp(x)$ in the region $-\infty < x < \infty$
4. $f(x) = -\log (-x)$ in the region $-1 \le x <0$
5. $f(x)=\sin^{-1}x$ in the region $0\le x\le 1$

The following functions are completely monotonic on [0,∞)

1. $f(x) = c$ for $c \geq 0$
2. $f(x) = e^{-tx}$ for $t \geq 0$
3. $f(x) = (1+x)^{-\beta}$ for $\beta \geq 0$
4. $f(x) = \log(1+1/x)$ because it is the Laplace transform of $(1-\exp(-t))/t \geq 0$

The following combinations of completely and absolutely monotonic functions are completely monotonic:

- non-negative linear combination of completely monotonic functions
- product of completely monotonic functions
- $f \circ g$ where $f$ is absolutely monotonic and $g$ is completely monotonic
- $f \circ g$ where $f$ is completely monotonic and $g$ is a Bernstein function ($g \geq 0$ and its derivative $g'$ is completely monotonic)

The forward difference $f(x) - f(x+b)$ for $b \geq 0$ of a completely monotonic function $f$ is completely monotonic (since $(-1)^n f^{(n)}$ is a decreasing function for all $n \geq 0$).

=== Upper bound on derivatives ===
If $f$ is completely monotonic on $[x-a,x]$ with $a > 0$, we can use Taylor's theorem with the Lagrange remainder

$$f(x-a) = \sum_{k=0}^{n-1} \frac{(-1)^k f^{(k)} (x)}{k!} a^k + \frac{(-1)^n f^{(n)} (\xi)}{n!} a^n \geq \frac{(-1)^n f^{(n)} (x)}{n!} a^n$$

where $x-a \leq \xi \leq x$ and we have used that $(-1)^k f^{(k)} (x) \geq 0$ for all $k$ and $(-1)^n f^{(n)}$ is decreasing. From this we get the upper bound

$$(-1)^n f^{(n)}(x) \leq \frac{n!}{a^n} f(x-a)$$

As a consequence, the coefficients $c_n$ of the Taylor series of $f$ at $x$ verify $|c_n| = |f^{(n)} (x)| / n! \leq f(x-a) \, a^{-n}$ and applying the Cauchy–Hadamard theorem we find that the radius of convergence of the Taylor series at $x$ is at least $a$.

=== Bounds by Taylor polynomials ===
If $f$ is completely monotonic on $[x,x+b]$ with $b > 0$, then we can write $f(x+b) = P_n(b) + \frac{f^{(n+1)}(\xi)}{(n+1)!} b^{n+1}$ where $P_n$ is the Taylor polynomial of order $n$ of $f$ at $x$ and $x \leq \xi \leq x+b$ and since the sign of $f^{(n)} (\xi)$ depends on the parity of $n$, for all $k \geq 0$ we have

$$P_{2k+1}(b) \leq f(x+b) \leq P_{2k}(b)$$

This then implies that $f$ is analytic on $[x,x+R)$ where $R$ is the radius of convergence of the Taylor series of $f$ at $x$ and if we have $R > 0$.

=== Bernstein's little theorem ===
From the above results on the radius of convergence of the Taylor series and on the anlyticity of a completely monotonic function we can deduce the following result, sometimes called Bernstein's little theorem.

A function that is completely monotonic on the open interval $(a,b)$ can be extended to an analytic function on the open disk in the complex plane defined by $|z-b| < b-a$ and this function will be completely monotonic on the interval $(a,b]$. It follows that if a function is completely monotonic on $(a,\infty)$ then it can be extended to an analytic function on the complex half-plane $\operatorname{Re}(z) > a$ and if it is completely monotonic on $(-\infty,b)$ then it can be extended to a function that is analytic in the whole complex plane.

Similar results hold for any absolutely monotonic function $f$, as its reverse $f(-x)$ is completely monotonic. A function that is absolutely monotonic on the open interval $(a,b)$ can be extended to an analytic function on the open disk in the complex plane defined by $|z-a| < b-a$ and this function will be absolutely monotonic on the interval $[a,b)$. It follows that if a function is absolutely monotonic on $(-\infty,b)$ then it can be extended to an analytic function on the complex half-plane $\operatorname{Re}(z) < b$ and if it is absolutely monotonic on $(a,\infty)$ then it can be extended to a function that is analytic in the whole complex plane.

=== Compactness ===
The set of completely monotonic functions on $(0,\infty)$ such that $f \leq 1$ is a compact subset of $C^\infty(0,\infty)$ for the usual Fréchet topology.

=== Representation ===
Bernstein's theorem on monotone functions: A function $f(x)$ that is completely monotonic on $[0,\infty)$ can be represented there as a Laplace integral in the form

$$f(x) = \int_0^\infty e^{-xt}\, d\mu(t)$$

where $\mu(t)$ is non-decreasing and bounded on $[0,\infty)$.

=== Log-convexity ===
From the Laplace transform representation we get

$$(-1)^n f^{(n)} (x) = \int_0^\infty t^n e^{-xt}\, d\mu(t)$$

and then we can use the Cauchy–Schwarz inequality applied to the functions $t^{(n-1)/2}$and $t^{(n+1)/2}$ with weight $e^{-xt} \, d\mu(t)$ to get

$$(f^{(n)} (x))^2 \leq f^{(n-1)} (x) f^{(n+1)} (x)$$

This means that for every $x$ the sequence $f^{(n)} (x)$ for $n \geq 0$ is log-convex. It also means that for every $n$ the function $f^{(n)}$ is log-convex because $(\log f^{(n)})'' = (f^{(n)} f^{(n+2)} - (f^{(n+1)})^2) / (f^{(n)})^2 \geq 0$.

More general inequalities can be found based on the notion of Schur-convexity.

== Bernstein functions ==
=== Definition ===
Related to the above, Bernstein functions are defined as those that are non-negative and whose derivative is completely monotonic.

=== Examples ===
The following functions are Bernstein functions

1. $f(x) = x^\beta$ for $\beta \in [0,1]$
2. $f(x) = \log(1+x)$
3. $f(x) = x/(1+x)$
4. $f(x) = 1 - e^{-tx}$ for $t \geq 0$

=== Representation ===
Every Bernstein function has the representation:

$$f(t) = a + bt + \int_0^\infty \left(1 - e^{-tx}\right) \mu(dx),$$

where $a,b \geq 0$ and $\mu$ is a measure on the positive real half-line such that

$$\int_0^\infty \left(1\wedge x\right) \mu(dx) < \infty.$$

== Absolutely and completely monotonic sequences ==
=== Definition ===
A sequence $\{\mu_n\}_{n=0}^\infty$ is called an absolutely monotonic sequence if its elements are non-negative and its successive differences are all non-negative, that is, if

$$\Delta^k\mu_n\ge 0, \quad n,k = 0,1,2,\ldots$$

where $\Delta^k\mu_n = \sum_{m=0}^k (-1)^m {k \choose m}\mu_{n+k-m}$.

A sequence $\{\mu_n\}_{n=0}^\infty$ is called a completely monotonic sequence if its elements are non-negative and its successive differences are alternately non-positive and non-negative, that is, if

$$(-1)^k\Delta^k\mu_n\ge 0, \quad n,k = 0,1,2,\ldots$$

=== Examples ===
The sequences $\left\{\frac{1}{n+1}\right\}_0^\infty$ and $\{c^n\}_0^\infty$ for $0\le c \le 1$ are completely monotonic sequences.

=== Representation ===
A sequence $\{\mu_n\}_0^\infty$ is completely monotonic if and only if there exists an increasing function $\alpha(t)$ on $[0,1]$ such that

$$\mu_n = \int_0^1 t^n \, d\alpha(t), \quad n=0,1,2,\ldots$$

The determination of this function from the sequence is referred to as the Hausdorff moment problem.

== Logarithmically completely monotonic functions ==
A positive function $f$ is said to be logarithmically completely monotonic if $\log f$ is completely monotonic.

Every logarithmically completely monotonic function is completely monotonic. Writing $f(x) = e^{g(x)}$ with $g = \log f$, Faà di Bruno's formula expresses the $n$-th derivative of $f$ as

$$f^{(n)}(x) = e^{g(x)} B_n \bigl(g'(x), g''(x), \dots, g^{(n)}(x)\bigr),$$

where $B_n$ denotes the $n$-th Bell polynomial. Each Bell polynomial is a finite sum of monomials of the form $\prod_{i=1}^n (g^{(i)})^{k_i}$ with the exponents satisfying $\sum_{i=1}^n i k_i = n$ and all coefficients strictly positive. Since logarithmic complete monotonicity implies $(-1)^i g^{(i)}(x) \geq 0$, we get

$0 \leq \prod_{i=1}^n ((-1)^i g^{(i)}(x))^{k_i} = (-1)^{\sum_{i=1}^n i k_i} \prod_{i=1}^n (g^{(i)}(x))^{k_i} = (-1)^n \prod_{i=1}^n (g^{(i)}(x))^{k_i}$

so that $(-1)^n B_n \bigl(g'(x), g''(x), \dots, g^{(n)}(x)\bigr) \geq 0$.

As $e^{g(x)} > 0$, it follows that $(-1)^n f^{(n)}(x) \ge 0$. As this true for all $n \ge 0$, we get that $f$ is completely monotonic.

Note that this is a special case of $h \circ g$ being completely monotonic when $h$ is absolutely monotonic and $g$ is completely monotonic, for the case of $h$ being the exponential function. This can be proved as above with the more general version of Faà di Bruno's formula.

The converse implication is false in general, and logarithmically completely monotonic functions form a proper subclass of completely monotonic functions.

== See also ==
- Bernstein's theorem on monotone functions
- Hausdorff moment problem
- Monotonic function
- Cyclical monotonicity
