= Paul C. Rosenbloom =

American mathematician (1920-2005)

- Born: 1920
- Died: 2005 (aged 84–85)
- Education: University of Pennsylvania; Stanford University
- Awards: Guggenheim Fellow
- Scientific career
- Fields: mathematics

Paul Charles Rosenbloom (1920 in Portsmouth, Virginia – 2005) was an American mathematician.

== Life ==
Rosenbloom studied at the University of Pennsylvania, where as an undergraduate he became a Putnam Fellow in 1941. In 1944 he earned his PhD from Stanford University under Gábor Szegő with thesis On sequences of polynomials, especially sections of power series. He was a professor of mathematics at Brown University, Syracuse University (around 1951), the University of Minnesota (middle to end of the 1950s), and Teachers College, Columbia University (from the 1960s to his retirement as professor emeritus). His doctoral students include Henry Gordon Rice.

Rosenbloom's research includes analysis, special functions, differential equations, logic, and the teaching of mathematics. In the academic year 1959–1960 he was the director of the Minnesota School Mathematics Center.

In 1946 he was a Guggenheim Fellow. He was at the Institute for Advanced Study for the academic years 1953–1954 and 1971–1972.

== Works ==
- with P. Erdős: Erdös, P.; Rosenbloom, P. C. (1946). "Toeplitz methods which sum a given sequence". Bull. Amer. Math. Soc. 52 (6): 463–464. doi:10.1090/s0002-9904-1946-08593-6. MR 0017383.
- Rosenbloom, P. C. (1946). "Some properties of absolutely monotonic functions". Bull. Amer. Math. Soc. 52 (6): 458–462. doi:10.1090/s0002-9904-1946-08591-2. MR 0016769.
- The Elements of Mathematical Logic, Dover 1950, 2005
- with A. N. Milgram: Milgram, A. N.; Rosenbloom, P. C. (1951). "Harmonic Forms and Heat Conduction: I: Closed Riemannian Manifolds". Proc Natl Acad Sci U S A. 37 (3): 180–184. Bibcode:1951PNAS...37..180M. doi:10.1073/pnas.37.3.180. PMC 1063329. PMID 16589000.
- with A. N. Milgram: Milgram, A. N.; Rosenbloom, P. C. (1951). "Heat Conduction on Riemannian Manifolds: II: Heat Distribution on Complexes and Approximation Theory". Proc Natl Acad Sci U S A. 37 (7): 435–436. Bibcode:1951PNAS...37..435M. doi:10.1073/pnas.37.7.435. PMC 1063395. PMID 16578379.
- Linear Partial Differential Equations, in George Elmer Forsythe, Rosenbloom: Numerical analysis and partial differential equations, Wiley 1958
- with D. V. Widder: Rosenbloom, P. C.; Widder, D. V. (1959). "Expansions in terms of heat polynomials and associated functions". Trans. Amer. Math. Soc. 92 (2): 220–266. doi:10.1090/s0002-9947-1959-0107118-2. MR 0107118.
- as editor: Modern viewpoints in the curriculum: National Conference on Curriculum Experimentation, (Conference in 1961), McGraw Hill 1964
- with Seymour Schuster: Prelude to Analysis, Prentice–Hall 1966
- Rosenbloom, P. C. (1973). "Trèves' identity". Proc. Amer. Math. Soc. 38 (1): 151–154. doi:10.1090/s0002-9939-1973-0312303-3. MR 0312303.
- Rosenbloom, P. C. (1973). "A fixed point theorem for mappings in scaled metric spaces, with applications to partial differential equations". Bull. Amer. Math. Soc. 79 (3): 566–569. doi:10.1090/s0002-9904-1973-13206-9. MR 0315249.
- with A. Evyatar: Motivated Mathematics, Cambridge University Press 1981
