= Bisymmetric matrix =

Square matrix symmetric about both its diagonal and anti-diagonal

Symmetry pattern of a bisymmetric 5 × 5 matrix

In mathematics, a bisymmetric matrix is a square matrix that is symmetric about both of its main diagonals. More precisely, an n × n matrix A is bisymmetric if it satisfies both A = A^{T} (it is its own transpose), and AJ = JA, where J is the n × n exchange matrix.

For example, any matrix of the form

$$\begin{bmatrix}
a & b & c & d & e \\
b & f & g & h & d \\
c & g & i & g & c \\
d & h & g & f & b \\
e & d & c & b & a \end{bmatrix}
= \begin{bmatrix}
a_{11} & a_{12} & a_{13} & a_{14} & a_{15} \\
a_{12} & a_{22} & a_{23} & a_{24} & a_{14} \\
a_{13} & a_{23} & a_{33} & a_{23} & a_{13} \\
a_{14} & a_{24} & a_{23} & a_{22} & a_{12} \\
a_{15} & a_{14} & a_{13} & a_{12} & a_{11}
\end{bmatrix}$$

is bisymmetric. The associated $5\times 5$ exchange matrix for this example is

$$J_{5} = \begin{bmatrix}
0 & 0 & 0 & 0 & 1 \\
0 & 0 & 0 & 1 & 0 \\
0 & 0 & 1 & 0 & 0 \\
0 & 1 & 0 & 0 & 0 \\
1 & 0 & 0 & 0 & 0
\end{bmatrix}$$

== Properties ==
- Bisymmetric matrices are both symmetric centrosymmetric and symmetric persymmetric.
- The product of two bisymmetric matrices is a centrosymmetric matrix.
- Real-valued bisymmetric matrices are precisely those symmetric matrices whose eigenvalues remain the same aside from possible sign changes following pre- or post-multiplication by the exchange matrix.
- If A is a real bisymmetric matrix with distinct eigenvalues, then the matrices that commute with A must be bisymmetric.
- The inverse of bisymmetric matrices can be represented by recurrence formulas.
