= Bernstein's theorem on monotone functions =

Mathematical theorem

In real analysis, a branch of mathematics, Bernstein's theorem, named after Sergei Bernstein, states that every real-valued function on the half-line [0, ∞) that is completely monotone is a mixture of exponential functions or in more abstract language, that it is the Laplace transform of a positive Borel measure on [0, ∞). In one important special case the mixture is a weighted average, or expected value. It is also known as the Bernstein–Widder theorem or Hausdorff–Bernstein–Widder theorem.

== History ==
The result was first proved by Bernstein in 1928, and similar results were discussed by David Widder in 1931 who refers to Bernstein but states that "The author had completed the proof of this theorem a few months after the publication of Bernstein's paper without being aware of its existence". The most cited reference is the 1941 book by Widder called The Laplace Transform. Later a simpler proof was given by Boris Korenblum. At around the same time Gustave Choquet studied the much more general concept of monotone functions on semigroups and gave a more abstract proof based on the Krein–Milman theorem. Felix Hausdorff had earlier characterised completely monotone sequences. These are the sequences occurring in the Hausdorff moment problem.

== Statement of the theorem ==
Complete monotonicity of a function f means that f is continuous on [0, ∞), infinitely differentiable on (0, ∞), and satisfies
$$(-1)^n \frac{d^n}{dt^n} f(t) \geq 0$$
for all nonnegative integers n and for all t > 0.

The "weighted average" statement can be characterized thus: there is a non-negative finite Borel measure on [0, ∞) with cumulative distribution function g such that
$$f(t) = \int_0^\infty e^{-tx} \, dg(x),$$
the integral being a Riemann–Stieltjes integral.

== Bernstein functions ==
Nonnegative functions whose derivative is completely monotone are called Bernstein functions. Every Bernstein function has the Lévy–Khintchine representation:
$$f(t) = a + bt + \int_0^\infty \left(1 - e^{-tx}\right) \mu(dx),$$
where $a,b \geq 0$ and $\mu$ is a measure on the positive real half-line such that
$$\int_0^\infty \left(1\wedge x\right) \mu(dx) < \infty.$$

== Schoenberg–Williamson theorem ==
The Schoenberg–Williamson theorem (also called Schoenberg's theorem on multiply monotone functions, Williamson's representation theorem) is the finite-order version of Bernstein's theorem. A k-monotone (or k-times monotone) function satisfies
$$(-1)^n \frac{d^n}{dt^n} f(t) \geq 0 \quad\text{for}\,\, \, 0 \leq n \leq k$$
The Schoenberg–Williamson theorem says that f is k-monotone on (0, ∞) if and only if
$$f(t)=\int_0^\infty (x-t)_+^{k-1} \, d\mu(x)$$
for some positive measure $\mu$ on (0, ∞).

The proof was published by Williamson in 1956 but in his paper he mentions that "This formula was discovered by Schoenberg in 1940 but has remained unpublished".

Using the Taylor series of $f$ with integral remainder, a more precise formula can be given
$$f(t) = \int_0^\infty \left(1-\frac{tx}{n}\right)_+^{n-1} f_n(x) \, dx$$
with
$$f_n(x) = \frac{(-1)^n}{n!} \left(\frac{n}{x}\right)^{n+1} f^{(n)} \left(\frac{n}{x}\right) I(x>0)$$
where $f^{(n)}(t) = \frac{d^n}{dt^n} f(t)$ and $I(x>0)$ is the indicator function of $\mathbb{R}_+^*$.

Note then that if $f$ is completely monotone then it is k-monotone for all $k \in \mathbb{N}$ and the Post–Widder inversion formula states that $f_n$converge in distribution to $\mu$ and $\left(1-\frac{tx}{n}\right)_+^{n-1}$ converges to $e^{-tx}$as $n$ goes to infinity, and we recover Bernstein's theorem.

== See also ==
- Absolutely and completely monotonic functions and sequences
- Choquet's theorem
- Krein–Milman theorem
