= Toeplitz matrix =

Matrix with shifting rows

In linear algebra, a Toeplitz matrix or diagonal-constant matrix, named after Otto Toeplitz, is a matrix in which each descending diagonal from left to right is constant. For instance, the following matrix is a Toeplitz matrix:

$$\qquad\begin{bmatrix}
a & b & c & d & e \\
f & a & b & c & d \\
g & f & a & b & c \\
h & g & f & a & b \\
i & h & g & f & a
\end{bmatrix}.$$

Any $n \times n$ matrix $A$ of the form

$$A = \begin{bmatrix}
a_0 & a_{-1}   & a_{-2} & \cdots & \cdots & a_{-(n-1)} \\
a_1 & a_0      & a_{-1} & \ddots &        & \vdots \\
a_2 & a_1      & \ddots & \ddots & \ddots & \vdots \\
\vdots & \ddots & \ddots & \ddots & a_{-1} & a_{-2} \\
\vdots &        & \ddots & a_1    & a_0    & a_{-1} \\
a_{n-1} & \cdots & \cdots & a_2    & a_1    & a_0
\end{bmatrix}$$

is a Toeplitz matrix. If the $i,j$ element of $A$ is denoted $A_{i,j}$ then we have

$$A_{i,j} = A_{i+1,j+1} = a_{i-j}.$$

A Toeplitz matrix is not necessarily square.

== Solving a Toeplitz system ==
A matrix equation of the form

$$Ax = b$$

is called a Toeplitz system if $A$ is a Toeplitz matrix. If $A$ is an $n \times n$ Toeplitz matrix, then the system has at most only $2n-1$ unique values, rather than $n^2$. We might therefore expect that the solution of a Toeplitz system would be easier, and indeed that is the case.

Toeplitz systems can be solved by algorithms such as the Schur algorithm or the Levinson algorithm in $O(n^2)$ time. Variants of the latter have been shown to be weakly stable (i.e. they exhibit numerical stability for well-conditioned linear systems). The algorithms can also be used to find the determinant of a Toeplitz matrix in $O(n^2)$ time.

A Toeplitz matrix can also be decomposed (i.e. factored) in $O(n^2)$ time. The Bareiss algorithm for an LU decomposition is stable. An LU decomposition gives a quick method for solving a Toeplitz system, and also for computing the determinant. Using displacement rank we obtain method requiring $\tilde O({\alpha ^{\omega - 1}}n)$ ops with the use of fast matrix multiplication algorithms, where $\alpha$ is the rank and $^ \sim 2.37 \le \omega < 3$.

== Properties ==
- An $n\times n$ Toeplitz matrix may be defined as a matrix $A$ where $A_{i,j}=c_{i-j}$, for constants $c_{1-n},\ldots,c_{n-1}$. The set of $n\times n$ Toeplitz matrices is a subspace of the vector space of $n\times n$ matrices (under matrix addition and scalar multiplication).
- Two Toeplitz matrices may be added in $O(n)$ time (by storing only one value of each diagonal) and multiplied in $O(n^2)$ time.
- Toeplitz matrices are persymmetric. Symmetric Toeplitz matrices are both centrosymmetric and bisymmetric.
- Toeplitz matrices are also closely connected with Fourier series, because the multiplication operator by a trigonometric polynomial, compressed to a finite-dimensional space, can be represented by such a matrix. Similarly, one can represent linear convolution as multiplication by a Toeplitz matrix.
- Toeplitz matrices are asymptotically equivalent to circulant matrices as the dimension grows, a result known as the Grenander–Szegő theorem. This asymptotic circulant property is the reason that the discrete Fourier transform approximately diagonalizes large Toeplitz matrices, and underlies the effectiveness of DFT-based spectral density estimation for stationary processes.
- Toeplitz matrices commute asymptotically. This means they diagonalize in the same basis when the row and column dimension tends to infinity.
- For symmetric Toeplitz matrices, there is the decomposition

$$\frac{1}{a_0} A = G G^\operatorname{T} - (G - I)(G - I)^\operatorname{T}$$

where $G$ is the lower triangular part of $\frac{1}{a_0} A$.

- The inverse of a nonsingular symmetric Toeplitz matrix has the representation

$$A^{-1} = \frac{1}{\alpha_0} (B B^\operatorname{T} - C C^\operatorname{T})$$

where $B$ and $C$ are lower triangular Toeplitz matrices and $C$ is a strictly lower triangular matrix.

== Discrete convolution ==
The convolution operation can be constructed as a matrix multiplication, where one of the inputs is converted into a Toeplitz matrix. For example, the convolution of $h$ and $x$ can be formulated as:

$$y = h \ast x =
\begin{bmatrix}
h_1 & 0 & \cdots & 0 & 0 \\
h_2 & h_1 &      & \vdots & \vdots \\
h_3 & h_2 & \cdots & 0 & 0 \\
\vdots & h_3 & \cdots & h_1 & 0 \\
h_{m-1} & \vdots & \ddots & h_2 & h_1 \\
h_m & h_{m-1} &      & \vdots & h_2 \\
0 & h_m & \ddots & h_{m-2} & \vdots \\
0 & 0 & \cdots & h_{m-1} & h_{m-2} \\
\vdots & \vdots &        & h_m & h_{m-1} \\
0 & 0 & 0 & \cdots & h_m
\end{bmatrix}
\begin{bmatrix}
x_1 \\
x_2 \\
x_3 \\
\vdots \\
x_n
\end{bmatrix}$$

$$y^T =
\begin{bmatrix}
h_1 & h_2 & h_3 & \cdots & h_{m-1} & h_m
\end{bmatrix}
\begin{bmatrix}
x_1 & x_2 & x_3 & \cdots & x_n & 0 & 0 & 0& \cdots & 0 \\
0 & x_1 & x_2 & x_3 & \cdots & x_n & 0 & 0 & \cdots & 0 \\
0 & 0 & x_1 & x_2 & x_3 & \ldots & x_n & 0  & \cdots & 0 \\
\vdots &    & \vdots & \vdots & \vdots &    & \vdots & \vdots  & & \vdots \\
0 & \cdots & 0 & 0 & x_1 & \cdots & x_{n-2} & x_{n-1} & x_n & 0 \\
0 & \cdots & 0 & 0 & 0 & x_1 & \cdots & x_{n-2} & x_{n-1} & x_n
\end{bmatrix}.$$

This approach can be extended to compute autocorrelation, cross-correlation, moving average etc.

== Infinite Toeplitz matrix ==
A bi-infinite Toeplitz matrix (i.e. entries indexed by $\mathbb Z\times\mathbb Z$) $A$ induces a linear operator on $\ell^2$.

$$A=\begin{bmatrix}
& \vdots & \vdots & \vdots & \vdots \\
\cdots & a_0 & a_{-1} & a_{-2} & a_{-3} & \cdots \\
\cdots & a_1 & a_0 &  a_{-1} & a_{-2} & \cdots   \\
\cdots & a_2 & a_1 & a_0 & a_{-1} & \cdots  \\
\cdots & a_3 & a_2 & a_1 & a_0 & \cdots \\
& \vdots  & \vdots & \vdots & \vdots
\end{bmatrix}.$$

The induced operator is bounded if and only if the coefficients of the Toeplitz matrix $A$ are the Fourier coefficients of some essentially bounded function $f$.

In such cases, $f$ is called the symbol of the Toeplitz matrix $A$, and the spectral norm of the Toeplitz matrix $A$ coincides with the $L^\infty$ norm of its symbol. The proof can be found as Theorem 1.1 of Böttcher and Grudsky.

== See also ==
- Circulant matrix, a square Toeplitz matrix with the additional property that $a_i=a_{i+n}$
- Hankel matrix, an "upside down" (i.e., row-reversed) Toeplitz matrix
- Szegő limit theorems – Determinant of large Toeplitz matrices
- Toeplitz operator
