= Orthogonal polynomials on the unit circle =

In mathematics, orthogonal polynomials on the unit circle are families of polynomials that are orthogonal with respect to integration over the unit circle in the complex plane, for some probability measure on the unit circle. They were introduced by Szegő (1920, 1921, 1939) and they are also called Szegő polynomials.

== Definition ==
Let $\mu$ be a probability measure on the unit circle $\mathbb{T} =\{z\in\mathbb{C} :|z|=1\}$ and assume $\mu$ is nontrivial, i.e., its support is an infinite set. By a combination of the Radon-Nikodym and Lebesgue decomposition theorems, any such measure can be uniquely decomposed into

$$d\mu =w(\theta) \frac{d\theta}{2\pi} + d\mu_s$$,

where $d\mu_s$ is singular with respect to $d\theta/2\pi$ and $w \in L^{1}(\mathbb{T})$ with $wd\theta/2\pi$ the absolutely continuous part of $d\mu$. The corresponding Hermittean scalar product is

$$\langle f|g\rangle = \int_{-\pi}^{+\pi} \overline{f(e^{i\theta})}g(e^{i\theta})\,d\mu(\theta)$$

The orthogonal polynomials associated with $\mu$ are defined as

$$\Phi_n(z)=z^n + \text{lower order}$$,

such that

$$\langle {z}^j|\Phi_n(z)\rangle =0, \quad j = 0,1,\dots,n-1.\quad$$

== The Szegő recurrence ==
The monic orthogonal Szegő polynomials satisfy a recurrence relation of the form

$$\Phi_{n+1}(z)=z\Phi_n(z)-\overline\alpha_n\Phi_n^*(z)$$
$$\Phi_{n+1}^{\ast}(z)=\Phi_n^{\ast}(z)-\alpha_n z\Phi_n(z)$$

for $n \geq 0$ and initial condition $\Phi_0=1$ with definition

$$\Phi_n^*(z)=z^n\overline{\Phi_n(1/\overline{z})}$$.

The result polynomial has conjugate coefficients of $v_n$ in the reverse order, hence it is unique. After substitution of $z=0$ into first recurrence one gets

$$\alpha_n = -\overline{\Phi_{n+1}(0)}$$

called the Verblunsky coefficients. Moreover,

$$\|\Phi_{n+1}\|^{2} = \prod_{j=0}^{n} (1-|\alpha_j|^2) = (1-|\alpha_n|^2)\|\Phi_n\|^2$$.

Geronimus' theorem states that the Verblunsky coefficients associated with $d\mu$ are the Schur parameters:

$$\alpha_n(d\mu) = \gamma_n$$

=== Verblunsky's theorem ===
Verblunsky's theorem states that for any sequence of numbers $\{\alpha_{j}^{(0)}\}_{j=0}^{\infty}$ in $\mathbb{D}$ there is a unique nontrivial probability measure $\mu$ on $\mathbb{T}$ with $\alpha_j(d\mu)=\alpha_j^{(0)}$.

=== Baxter's theorem ===
Baxter's theorem states that the Verblunsky coefficients form an absolutely convergent series if and only if the moments of $\mu$ form an absolutely convergent series and the weight function $w$ is strictly positive everywhere.

== Szegő's theorem ==
For any nontrivial probability measure $d\mu$ on $\mathbb{T}$, Verblunsky's form of Szegő's theorem states that

$$\prod_{n = 0}^\infty(1-|\alpha_n|^2) = \exp\big(\frac{1}{2\pi}\int_0^{2\pi}\log w(\theta)\,d\theta\big).$$

The left-hand side is independent of $d\mu_s$ but unlike Szegő's original version, where $d\mu = d\mu_{ac}$, Verblunsky's form does allow $d\mu_s \neq 0$. Subsequently,

$$\sum_{n = 0}^\infty |\alpha_n|^2 < \infty \;\iff\; \frac{1}{2\pi}\int_0^{2\pi}\log w(\theta)\,d\theta > -\infty$$.

One of the consequences is the existence of a mixed spectrum for discretized Schrödinger operators.

== Rakhmanov's theorem ==
Rakhmanov's theorem states that if the absolutely continuous part $w$ of the measure $\mu$ is positive almost everywhere then the Verblunsky coefficients $\alpha_n$ tend to 0.

== Derivation of Szegő recurrence ==
Szegő derivation relied on Christoffel-Darboux formula. A simpler one from uses only orthogonality properties. For induction procedure we assume that orthogonal polynomials up to order n are known

$$\langle \phi_k|\phi_l\rangle = 0 ~~for~~k\neq l,$$

and request

$$\langle v_n|\phi_{n+1}\rangle = 0$$

for any polynomial $v_n$ of order n or less. Since by virtue of orthogonality $\phi_k,\;k=0,1,\cdots,n$ form a vector base, a polynomial $v_n$ is expandable as $v_n=\sum_{j=0}^{n}c_n{\phi_j(z)}$. It follows that $\phi_{n+1}(z)-z^{n+1}=w_n(z)\equiv z^n\overline{v_n}=-z^n\sum_{j=0}^{n}\overline{\alpha^{(n)}_j\phi_j(z)}$ where $-\alpha^{(j)}_j\equiv c_j$. If so, than

$$\frac{\phi_{n+1}(z)-z^{n+1}}{z^{n}}=\overline{v_n}=\sum_{j=0}^{n}\overline{\alpha^{(n)}_j\phi_j(z)}.$$

For $k\leq n$ scalar product of $\overline{\phi_k(z)}$ times both sides of the last equation yields:

$$\begin{array}{l}
R.H.S=-\overline{\alpha^{(n)}_k}\|\phi_k(z)\|^2\\
L.H.S=\langle\overline{\phi_k}|z^{-n}\phi_{n+1}\rangle-\langle\overline{\phi_k}|z\rangle=
\langle z^n\overline{\phi_k}|\phi_{n+1}\rangle-\langle 1|z\phi_k\rangle=0-\langle 1|z\phi_k|\rangle
\end{array}$$

after expansion of products integrands into $\overline{f(z)}g(z)$. In this way we obtain

$$\overline{\alpha_k}=\frac{\langle 1|z\phi_k\rangle }{\|\phi_k(z)\|^2}$$

independent of n, hence we dropped the superscript $(n)$.

Previous result may be transformed to

$$\phi_{n+1}(z)=z^{n+1}-z^{n}\sum_{k=0}^{n}\overline\alpha_k\overline{\phi_k(z)}.$$

Using it twice after canceling of most sum terms yields Szegő recurrence in the form

$$\phi_{n+1}(z)-z\phi_{n}(z)=-z^{n}\overline{\alpha_k}\overline{\phi_k(z)}=
-\overline{\alpha_n}\phi^*(z).$$

Application to both sides of $^*$ transform yields second recurrence. After rearrangement of first recurrence and taking square norms follows $\|z\phi_n\|^2=\|\phi_n\|^2= <\phi_{n+1}-\overline{\alpha_n}\phi_n^*|\phi_{n+1}-\overline{\alpha_n}\phi_n^*>=\|\phi_{n+1}\|^2-0+|\alpha_n|^2\|\phi_n^*\|^2$ as $<\phi_{n+1}|\phi_n^*>=0$ because of orthogonality. Expansion if integrands into $\overline{f(z)}f(z)$ demonstrates that $\|\phi_n^*\|^2=\|z^n\overline{\phi_n}\|=\|\phi_n\|^2$ so

$$\|\phi_n\|^2(1-|\alpha_n|^2)=\|\phi_{n+1}\|^2\;\Rightarrow\;1>|\alpha_n|^2\geq 0.$$

Inequality follows from positivity of both norms.

== Examples ==
The Rogers–Szegő polynomials are an example of orthogonal polynomials on the unit circle.

== See also ==
- Trigonometric moment problem
- Schur class
