= Schur class =

In complex analysis, the Schur class is the set of holomorphic functions $f(z)$ defined on the open unit disk $\mathbb{D} = \{ z\in \mathbb{C} : |z|<1\}$ and satisfying $|f(z)| \leq 1$.

== Schur problem (or Carathéodory-Fejér interpolation) ==
Given complex numbers $c_0,c_1,\dotsc,c_n$, find a function
$$f(z) = \sum_{j=0}^{n} c_j z^j  + \sum_{j=n+1}^{\infty}f_j z^j,$$
which is analytic and bounded by 1 on the unit disk. The method of solving this problem as well as similar problems (e.g. solving Toeplitz systems and Nevanlinna-Pick interpolation) is known as the Schur algorithm (also called coefficient stripping or layer stripping). One of the algorithm's most important properties is that it generates n + 1 orthogonal polynomials which can be used as orthonormal basis functions to expand any nth-order polynomial. It is closely related to the Levinson algorithm though Schur algorithm is numerically more stable and better suited to parallel processing.

== Schur function ==
Consider the Carathéodory function of a unique probability measure $d\mu$ on the unit circle $\mathbb{T} =\{z\in\mathbb{C} :|z|=1\}$ given by
$$F(z) = \int \frac{e^{i\theta} + z}{e^{i\theta} - z} d\mu(\theta),$$
where $\int d\mu(\theta) = 1$ implies $F(0)=1$. Then the association
$$F(z) = \frac{1+zf(z)}{1-zf(z)},$$
sets up a one-to-one correspondence between Carathéodory functions and Schur functions $f(z)$ given by the inverse formula:
$$f(z) = z^{-1}\left( \frac{F(z)-1}{F(z)+1} \right).$$

== Schur algorithm ==
Schur's algorithm is an iterative construction based on Möbius transformations that maps one Schur function to another. The algorithm defines an infinite sequence of Schur functions $f\equiv f_0,f_1,\dotsc,f_n,\dotsc$ and Schur parameters $\gamma_0,\gamma_1,\dotsc,\gamma_n,\dotsc$ (also called Verblunsky coefficient or reflection coefficient) via the recursion:
$$f_{j+1}=\frac{1}{z}\frac{f_j(z)-\gamma_j}{1-\overline{\gamma_j}f_j(z)}, \quad f_j(0)\equiv \gamma_j \in \mathbb{D},$$
which stops if $f_j(z)\equiv e^{i\theta} = \gamma_j \in \mathbb{T}$. One can invert the transformation as
$$f(z)\equiv f_0 (z) = \frac{\gamma_0 + zf_1(z)}{1 + \overline{\gamma_0} z f_1(z) }$$
or, equivalently, as continued fraction expansion of the Schur function
$$f_0(z)=\gamma_0+\frac{1-|\gamma_0|^2}{\overline {\gamma_0}+\frac{1}{z \gamma_1+\frac{z(1-|\gamma_1|^2)}{\overline {\gamma_1}+\frac{1}{z\gamma_2+\cdots}}}}$$
by repeatedly using the fact that
$$f_j(z)=\gamma_j+\frac{1-|\gamma_j|^2}{\overline {\gamma_j}+\frac{1}{zf_{j+1}(z)}}.$$

== See also ==
- Orthogonal polynomials on the unit circle
- Szegő polynomial
