= Nuclear operators between Banach spaces =

In mathematics, nuclear operators between Banach spaces are a linear operators between Banach spaces in infinite dimensions that share some of the properties of their counter-part in finite dimension. In Hilbert spaces such operators are usually called trace class operators and one can define such things as the trace. In Banach spaces this is no longer possible for general nuclear operators, it is however possible for $\tfrac{2}{3}$-nuclear operator via the Grothendieck trace theorem.

The general definition for Banach spaces was given by Grothendieck. This article presents both cases but concentrates on the general case of nuclear operators on Banach spaces.

== Nuclear operators on Hilbert spaces ==
An operator $\mathcal L$ on a Hilbert space $\mathcal H$ $\mathcal{L} : \mathcal{H} \to \mathcal{H}$ is compact if it can be written in the form $\mathcal{L} = \sum_{n=1}^N \rho_n \langle f_n, \cdot \rangle g_n,$ where $1 \leq N \leq \infty,$ and $\{f_1, \ldots, f_N\}$ and $\{g_1, \ldots, g_N\}$ are (not necessarily complete) orthonormal sets. Here $\{\rho_1, \ldots, \rho_N\}$ is a set of real numbers, the set of singular values of the operator, obeying $\rho_n \to 0$ if $N = \infty.$

The bracket $\langle\cdot, \cdot\rangle$ is the scalar product on the Hilbert space; the sum on the right hand side must converge in norm.

An operator that is compact as defined above is said to be nuclear or trace-class if $\sum_{n=1}^\infty |\rho_n| < \infty.$

=== Properties ===
A nuclear operator on a Hilbert space has the important property that a trace operation may be defined. Given an orthonormal basis $\{\psi_n\}$ for the Hilbert space, the trace is defined as $\operatorname{Tr} \mathcal {L} = \sum_n \langle \psi_n, \mathcal{L} \psi_n \rangle.$

Obviously, the sum converges absolutely, and it can be proven that the result is independent of the basis. It can be shown that this trace is identical to the sum of the eigenvalues of $\mathcal{L}$ (counted with multiplicity).

== Nuclear operators on Banach spaces ==
The definition of trace-class operator was extended to Banach spaces by Alexander Grothendieck in 1955.

Let $A$ and $B$ be Banach spaces, and $A^{\prime}$ be the dual of $A,$ that is, the set of all continuous or (equivalently) bounded linear functionals on $A$ with the usual norm. There is a canonical evaluation map $A^{\prime} \otimes B \to \operatorname{Hom}(A, B)$ (from the projective tensor product of $A$ and $B$ to the Banach space of continuous linear maps from $A$ to $B$). It is determined by sending $f \in A^{\prime}$ and $b \in B$ to the linear map $a \mapsto f(a) \cdot b.$ An operator $\mathcal L \in \operatorname{Hom}(A,B)$ is called nuclear if it is in the image of this evaluation map.

=== q-nuclear operators ===
An operator $\mathcal{L} : A \to B$ is said to be nuclear of order $q$ if there exist sequences of vectors $\{g_n\} \in B$ with $\Vert g_n \Vert \leq 1,$ functionals $\left\{f^*_n\right\} \in A^{\prime}$ with $\Vert f^*_n \Vert \leq 1$ and complex numbers $\{\rho_n\}$ with $\sum_n |\rho_n|^q < \infty,$ such that the operator may be written as $\mathcal{L} = \sum_n \rho_n f^*_n(\cdot) g_n$ with the sum converging in the operator norm.

Operators that are nuclear of order 1 are called nuclear operators: these are the ones for which the series $\sum \rho_n$ is absolutely convergent. Nuclear operators of order 2 are called Hilbert–Schmidt operators.

=== Relation to trace-class operators ===
With additional steps, a trace may be defined for such operators when $A = B.$

=== Properties ===
The trace and determinant can no longer be defined in general in Banach spaces. However they can be defined for the so-called $\tfrac{2}{3}$-nuclear operators via Grothendieck trace theorem.

=== Generalizations ===
More generally, an operator from a locally convex topological vector space $A$ to a Banach space $B$ is called nuclear if it satisfies the condition above with all $f_n^*$ bounded by 1 on some fixed neighborhood of 0.

An extension of the concept of nuclear maps to arbitrary monoidal categories is given by Stolz & Teichner (2012). A monoidal category can be thought of as a category equipped with a suitable notion of a tensor product. An example of a monoidal category is the category of Banach spaces or alternatively the category of locally convex, complete, Hausdorff spaces; both equipped with the projective tensor product. A map $f : A \to B$ in a monoidal category is called thick if it can be written as a composition $A \cong I \otimes A \stackrel{t \otimes \operatorname{id}_A} \longrightarrow B \otimes C \otimes A \stackrel{\operatorname{id}_B \otimes s} \longrightarrow B \otimes I \cong B$ for an appropriate object $C$ and maps $t: I \to B \otimes C, s: C \otimes A \to I,$ where $I$ is the monoidal unit.

In the monoidal category of Banach spaces, equipped with the projective tensor product, a map is thick if and only if it is nuclear.

== Examples ==
Suppose that $f : H_1 \to H_2$ and $g : H_2 \to H_3$ are Hilbert-Schmidt operators between Hilbert spaces. Then the composition $g \circ f : H_1 \to H_3$ is a nuclear operator.

== See also ==
- Topological tensor product – Tensor product constructions for topological vector spaces
- Nuclear operator – Linear operator related to topological vector spaces
- Nuclear space – A generalization of finite-dimensional Euclidean spaces different from Hilbert spaces
