= Inductive tensor product =

The finest locally convex topological vector space (TVS) topology on $X \otimes Y,$ the tensor product of two locally convex TVSs, making the canonical map $\cdot \otimes \cdot : X \times Y \to X \otimes Y$ (defined by sending $(x, y) \in X \times Y$ to $x \otimes y$) separately continuous is called the inductive topology or the $\iota$-topology. When $X \otimes Y$ is endowed with this topology then it is denoted by $X \otimes_{\iota} Y$ and called the inductive tensor product of $X$ and $Y.$

== Preliminaries ==
Throughout let $X, Y,$ and $Z$ be locally convex topological vector spaces and $L : X \to Y$ be a linear map.

- $L : X \to Y$ is a topological homomorphism or homomorphism, if it is linear, continuous, and $L : X \to \operatorname{Im} L$ is an open map, where $\operatorname{Im} L,$ the image of $L,$ has the subspace topology induced by $Y.$
  - If $S \subseteq X$ is a subspace of $X$ then both the quotient map $X \to X / S$ and the canonical injection $S \to X$ are homomorphisms. In particular, any linear map $L : X \to Y$ can be canonically decomposed as follows: $X \to X / \operatorname{ker} L \overset{L_0}{\rightarrow} \operatorname{Im} L \to Y$ where $L_0(x + \ker L) := L(x)$ defines a bijection.
- The set of continuous linear maps $X \to Z$ (resp. continuous bilinear maps $X \times Y \to Z$) will be denoted by $L(X; Z)$ (resp. $B(X, Y; Z)$) where if $Z$ is the scalar field then we may instead write $L(X)$ (resp. $B(X, Y)$).
- We will denote the continuous dual space of $X$ by $X^{\prime}$ and the algebraic dual space (which is the vector space of all linear functionals on $X,$ whether continuous or not) by $X^{\#}.$
  - To increase the clarity of the exposition, we use the common convention of writing elements of $X^{\prime}$ with a prime following the symbol (e.g. $x^{\prime}$ denotes an element of $X^{\prime}$ and not, say, a derivative and the variables $x$ and $x^{\prime}$ need not be related in any way).
- A linear map $L : H \to H$ from a Hilbert space into itself is called positive if $\langle L(x), X \rangle \geq 0$ for every $x \in H.$ In this case, there is a unique positive map $r : H \to H,$ called the square-root of $L,$ such that $L = r \circ r.$
  - If $L : H_1 \to H_2$ is any continuous linear map between Hilbert spaces, then $L^* \circ L$ is always positive. Now let $R : H \to H$ denote its positive square-root, which is called the absolute value of $L.$ Define $U : H_1 \to H_2$ first on $\operatorname{Im} R$ by setting $U(x) = L(x)$ for $x = R \left(x_1\right) \in \operatorname{Im} R$ and extending $U$ continuously to $\overline{\operatorname{Im} R},$ and then define $U$ on $\operatorname{ker} R$ by setting $U(x) = 0$ for $x \in \operatorname{ker} R$ and extend this map linearly to all of $H_1.$ The map $U\big\vert_{\operatorname{Im} R} : \operatorname{Im} R \to \operatorname{Im} L$ is a surjective isometry and $L = U \circ R.$
- A linear map $\Lambda : X \to Y$ is called compact or completely continuous if there is a neighborhood $U$ of the origin in $X$ such that $\Lambda(U)$ is precompact in $Y.$
  - In a Hilbert space, positive compact linear operators, say $L : H \to H$ have a simple spectral decomposition discovered at the beginning of the 20th century by Fredholm and F. Riesz:

There is a sequence of positive numbers, decreasing and either finite or else converging to 0, $r_1 > r_2 > \cdots > r_k > \cdots$ and a sequence of nonzero finite dimensional subspaces $V_i$ of $H$ ($i = 1, 2, \ldots$) with the following properties: (1) the subspaces $V_i$ are pairwise orthogonal; (2) for every $i$ and every $x \in V_i,$ $L(x) = r_i x$; and (3) the orthogonal of the subspace spanned by $\cup_i V_i$ is equal to the kernel of $L.$

=== Notation for topologies ===
- $\sigma\left(X, X^{\prime}\right)$ denotes the coarsest topology on $X$ making every map in $X^{\prime}$ continuous and $X_{\sigma\left(X, X^{\prime}\right)}$ or $X_{\sigma}$ denotes $X$ endowed with this topology.
- $\sigma\left(X^{\prime}, X\right)$ denotes weak-* topology on $X^{\prime}$ and $X_{\sigma\left(X^{\prime}, X\right)}$ or $X^{\prime}_{\sigma}$ denotes $X^{\prime}$ endowed with this topology.
  - Every $x_0 \in X$ induces a map $X^{\prime} \to \R$ defined by $\lambda \mapsto \lambda \left(x_0\right).$ $\sigma\left(X^{\prime}, X\right)$ is the coarsest topology on $X^{\prime}$ making all such maps continuous.
- $b\left(X, X^{\prime}\right)$ denotes the topology of bounded convergence on $X$ and $X_{b\left(X, X^{\prime}\right)}$ or $X_b$ denotes $X$ endowed with this topology.
- $b\left(X^{\prime}, X\right)$ denotes the topology of bounded convergence on $X^{\prime}$ or the strong dual topology on $X^{\prime}$ and $X_{b\left(X^{\prime}, X\right)}$ or $X^{\prime}_b$ denotes $X^{\prime}$ endowed with this topology.
  - As usual, if $X^{\prime}$ is considered as a topological vector space but it has not been made clear what topology it is endowed with, then the topology will be assumed to be $b\left(X^{\prime}, X\right).$

== Universal property ==
Suppose that $Z$ is a locally convex space and that $I$ is the canonical map from the space of all bilinear mappings of the form $X \times Y \to Z,$ going into the space of all linear mappings of $X \otimes Y \to Z.$ Then when the domain of $I$ is restricted to $\mathcal{B}(X, Y; Z)$ (the space of separately continuous bilinear maps) then the range of this restriction is the space $L\left(X \otimes_{\iota} Y; Z\right)$ of continuous linear operators $X \otimes_{\iota} Y \to Z.$ In particular, the continuous dual space of $X \otimes_{\iota} Y$ is canonically isomorphic to the space $\mathcal{B}(X, Y),$ the space of separately continuous bilinear forms on $X \times Y.$

If $\tau$ is a locally convex TVS topology on $X \otimes Y$ ($X \otimes Y$ with this topology will be denoted by $X \otimes_{\tau} Y$), then $\tau$ is equal to the inductive tensor product topology if and only if it has the following property:

For every locally convex TVS $Z,$ if $I$ is the canonical map from the space of all bilinear mappings of the form $X \times Y \to Z,$ going into the space of all linear mappings of $X \otimes Y \to Z,$ then when the domain of $I$ is restricted to $\mathcal{B}(X, Y; Z)$ (space of separately continuous bilinear maps) then the range of this restriction is the space $L\left(X \otimes_{\tau} Y; Z\right)$ of continuous linear operators $X \otimes_{\tau} Y \to Z.$

== See also ==
- Auxiliary normed spaces
- Initial topology – Coarsest topology making certain functions continuous
- Injective tensor product
- Nuclear operator – Linear operator related to topological vector spaces
- Nuclear space – Generalization of finite-dimensional Euclidean spaces different from Hilbert spaces
- Projective tensor product
- Tensor product of Hilbert spaces – Tensor product space endowed with a special inner product
- Topological tensor product – Tensor product constructions for topological vector spaces

== Bibliography ==
- Diestel, Joe (2008). The metric theory of tensor products : Grothendieck's résumé revisited. Providence, R.I: American Mathematical Society. ISBN 978-0-8218-4440-3. OCLC 185095773.
- Dubinsky, Ed (1979). The structure of nuclear Fréchet spaces. Berlin New York: Springer-Verlag. ISBN 3-540-09504-7. OCLC 5126156.
- Grothendieck, Alexander (1966). Produits tensoriels topologiques et espaces nucléaires (in French). Providence: American Mathematical Society. ISBN 0-8218-1216-5. OCLC 1315788.
- Husain, Taqdir (1978). Barrelledness in topological and ordered vector spaces. Berlin New York: Springer-Verlag. ISBN 3-540-09096-7. OCLC 4493665.
- Khaleelulla, S. M. (1982). Counterexamples in Topological Vector Spaces. Lecture Notes in Mathematics. Vol. 936. Berlin, Heidelberg, New York: Springer-Verlag. ISBN 978-3-540-11565-6. OCLC 8588370.
- Narici, Lawrence; Beckenstein, Edward (2011). Topological Vector Spaces. Pure and applied mathematics (Second ed.). Boca Raton, FL: CRC Press. ISBN 978-1584888666. OCLC 144216834.
- Nlend, H (1977). Bornologies and functional analysis : introductory course on the theory of duality topology-bornology and its use in functional analysis. Amsterdam New York New York: North-Holland Pub. Co. Sole distributors for the U.S.A. and Canada, Elsevier-North Holland. ISBN 0-7204-0712-5. OCLC 2798822.
- Nlend, H (1981). Nuclear and conuclear spaces : introductory courses on nuclear and conuclear spaces in the light of the duality. Amsterdam New York New York, N.Y: North-Holland Pub. Co. Sole distributors for the U.S.A. and Canada, Elsevier North-Holland. ISBN 0-444-86207-2. OCLC 7553061.
- Pietsch, Albrecht (1972). Nuclear locally convex spaces. Berlin, New York: Springer-Verlag. ISBN 0-387-05644-0. OCLC 539541.
- Robertson, A. P. (1973). Topological vector spaces. Cambridge England: University Press. ISBN 0-521-29882-2. OCLC 589250.
- Ryan, Raymond (2002). Introduction to tensor products of Banach spaces. London New York: Springer. ISBN 1-85233-437-1. OCLC 48092184.
- Schaefer, Helmut H.; Wolff, Manfred P. (1999). Topological Vector Spaces. GTM. Vol. 8 (Second ed.). New York, NY: Springer New York Imprint Springer. ISBN 978-1-4612-7155-0. OCLC 840278135.
- Trèves, François (2006) [1967]. Topological Vector Spaces, Distributions and Kernels. Mineola, N.Y.: Dover Publications. ISBN 978-0-486-45352-1. OCLC 853623322.
- Wong (1979). Schwartz spaces, nuclear spaces, and tensor products. Berlin New York: Springer-Verlag. ISBN 3-540-09513-6. OCLC 5126158.
