= Schwartz kernel theorem =

Theorem

In mathematics, the Schwartz kernel theorem is a foundational result in the theory of generalized functions, published by Laurent Schwartz in 1952. It states, in broad terms, that the generalized functions introduced by Schwartz (Schwartz distributions) have a two-variable theory that includes all reasonable bilinear forms on the space $\mathcal{D}$ of test functions. The space $\mathcal{D}$ itself consists of smooth functions of compact support.

== Statement of the theorem ==
Let $X$ and $Y$ be open sets in $\mathbb{R}^n$. Every distribution $k \in \mathcal{D}'(X \times Y)$ defines a continuous linear map $K \colon \mathcal{D}(Y) \to \mathcal{D}'(X)$ such that

$\left \langle k, u \otimes v \right \rangle = \left \langle Kv , u \right \rangle$	1

for every $u \in \mathcal{D}(X), v \in \mathcal{D}(Y)$. Conversely, for every such continuous linear map $K$, there exists one and only one distribution $k \in \mathcal{D}'(X \times Y)$ such that (1) holds. The distribution $k$ is called the kernel of the map $K$, in reference to the kernel of an integral transform. In line with this, one sometimes writes the linear map $K$ informally as

$$Kv = \int_{Y} k(\cdot,y) v(y) d y$$

so that

$$\langle Kv,u \rangle = \int_{X} \int_{Y} k(x,y) v(y) u(x) d y d x$$.

== Integral kernels ==
The traditional kernel functions $K(x,y)$ of two variables of the theory of integral operators having been expanded in scope to include their generalized function analogues, which are allowed to be more singular in a serious way, a large class of operators from $\mathcal{D}$ to its dual space $\mathcal{D}'$ of distributions can be constructed. The point of the theorem is to assert that the extended class of operators can be characterised abstractly, as containing all operators subject to a minimum continuity condition. A bilinear form on $\mathcal{D}$ arises by pairing the image distribution with a test function.

A simple example is that the natural embedding of the test function space $\mathcal{D}$ into $\mathcal{D}'$ - sending every test function $f$ to its corresponding distribution $[f]$ - corresponds to the delta distribution

$$\delta(x-y)$$

concentrated at the diagonal of the underlined Euclidean space, in terms of the Dirac delta function $\delta$. While this is at most an observation, it shows how the distribution theory adds to the scope. Integral operators are not so 'singular'; another way to put it is that for $K$ a continuous kernel, only compact operators are created on a space such as the continuous functions on $[0,1]$. The operator $I$ is far from compact, and its kernel is intuitively speaking approximated by functions on $[0,1]\times[0,1]$ with a spike along the diagonal $x=y$ and vanishing elsewhere.

This result implies that the formation of distributions has a major property of 'closure' within the traditional domain of functional analysis. It was interpreted (comment of Jean Dieudonné) as a strong verification of the suitability of the Schwartz theory of distributions to mathematical analysis more widely seen. In his Éléments d'analyse volume 7, p. 3 he notes that the theorem includes differential operators on the same footing as integral operators, and concludes that it is perhaps the most important modern result of functional analysis. He goes on immediately to qualify that statement, saying that the setting is too 'vast' for differential operators, because of the property of monotonicity with respect to the support of a function, which is evident for differentiation. Even monotonicity with respect to singular support is not characteristic of the general case; its consideration leads in the direction of the contemporary theory of pseudo-differential operators.

== Smooth manifolds ==
Dieudonné proves a version of the Schwartz result valid for smooth manifolds, and additional supporting results, in sections 23.9 to 23.12 of that book.

== Generalization to nuclear spaces ==
Much of the theory of nuclear spaces was developed by Alexander Grothendieck while investigating the Schwartz kernel theorem and published in Grothendieck 1955. We have the following generalization of the theorem.

Schwartz kernel theorem: Suppose that X is nuclear, Y is locally convex, and v is a continuous bilinear form on $X \times Y$. Then v originates from a space of the form $X^{\prime}_{A^{\prime}} \widehat{\otimes}_{\epsilon} Y^{\prime}_{B^{\prime}}$ where $A^{\prime}$ and $B^{\prime}$ are suitable equicontinuous subsets of $X^{\prime}$ and $Y^{\prime}$. Equivalently, v is of the form,

$v(x, y) = \sum_{i=1}^{\infty} \lambda_i \left\langle x, x_i^{\prime} \right\rangle \left\langle y, y_i^{\prime} \right\rangle$ for all $(x, y) \in X \times Y$

where $\left( \lambda_i \right) \in l^1$ and each of $\{ x^{\prime}_1, x^{\prime}_2, \ldots \}$ and $\{ y^{\prime}_1, y^{\prime}_2, \ldots \}$ are equicontinuous. Furthermore, these sequences can be taken to be null sequences (i.e. converging to 0) in $X^{\prime}_{A^{\prime}}$ and $Y^{\prime}_{B^{\prime}}$, respectively.

== See also ==
- Fredholm kernel
- Injective tensor product
- Nuclear operator – Linear operator related to topological vector spaces
- Nuclear space – Generalization of finite-dimensional Euclidean spaces different from Hilbert spaces
- Projective tensor product
- Rigged Hilbert space – Construction for adding objects to a Hilbert space
- Trace class – Compact operator for which a finite trace can be defined

== Bibliography ==
- Grothendieck, Alexander (1955). "Produits Tensoriels Topologiques et Espaces Nucléaires" [Topological Tensor Products and Nuclear Spaces]. Memoirs of the American Mathematical Society Series (in French). 16. Providence: American Mathematical Society. MR 0075539. OCLC 9308061.
- Hörmander, L. (1983). The analysis of linear partial differential operators I. Grundl. Math. Wissenschaft. Vol. 256. Springer. doi:10.1007/978-3-642-96750-4. ISBN 3-540-12104-8. MR 0717035..
- Schaefer, Helmut H.; Wolff, Manfred P. (1999). Topological Vector Spaces. GTM. Vol. 8 (Second ed.). New York, NY: Springer New York Imprint Springer. ISBN 978-1-4612-7155-0. OCLC 840278135.
- Trèves, François (2006) [1967]. Topological Vector Spaces, Distributions and Kernels. Mineola, N.Y.: Dover Publications. ISBN 978-0-486-45352-1. OCLC 853623322.
- Wong, Yau-Chuen (1979). Schwartz spaces, nuclear spaces, and tensor products. Berlin New York: Springer-Verlag. ISBN 3-540-09513-6. OCLC 5126158.
