= Integral linear operator =

Mathematical function

In mathematical analysis, an integral linear operator is a linear operator T given by integration; i.e.,

$$(Tf)(x) = \int f(y) K(x, y) \, dy$$

where $K(x, y)$ is called an integration kernel.

More generally, an integral bilinear form is a bilinear functional that belongs to the continuous dual space of $X \widehat{\otimes}_{\epsilon} Y$, the injective tensor product of the locally convex topological vector spaces (TVSs) X and Y. An integral linear operator is a continuous linear operator that arises in a canonical way from an integral bilinear form.

These maps play an important role in the theory of nuclear spaces and nuclear maps.

== Definition - Integral forms as the dual of the injective tensor product ==
Let X and Y be locally convex TVSs, let $X \otimes_{\pi} Y$ denote the projective tensor product, $X \widehat{\otimes}_{\pi} Y$ denote its completion, let $X \otimes_{\epsilon} Y$ denote the injective tensor product, and $X \widehat{\otimes}_{\epsilon} Y$ denote its completion. Suppose that $\operatorname{In} : X \otimes_{\epsilon} Y \to X \widehat{\otimes}_{\epsilon} Y$ denotes the TVS-embedding of $X \otimes_{\epsilon} Y$ into its completion and let ${}^{t}\operatorname{In} : \left( X \widehat{\otimes}_{\epsilon} Y \right)^{\prime}_b \to \left( X \otimes_{\epsilon} Y \right)^{\prime}_b$ be its transpose, which is a vector space-isomorphism. This identifies the continuous dual space of $X \otimes_{\epsilon} Y$ as being identical to the continuous dual space of $X \widehat{\otimes}_{\epsilon} Y$.

Let $\operatorname{Id} : X \otimes_{\pi} Y \to X \otimes_{\epsilon} Y$ denote the identity map and ${}^{t}\operatorname{Id} : \left( X \otimes_{\epsilon} Y \right)^{\prime}_b \to \left( X \otimes_{\pi} Y \right)^{\prime}_b$ denote its transpose, which is a continuous injection. Recall that $\left( X \otimes_{\pi} Y \right)^{\prime}$ is canonically identified with $B(X, Y)$, the space of continuous bilinear maps on $X \times Y$. In this way, the continuous dual space of $X \otimes_{\epsilon} Y$ can be canonically identified as a vector subspace of $B(X, Y)$, denoted by $J(X, Y)$. The elements of $J(X, Y)$ are called integral (bilinear) forms on $X \times Y$. The following theorem justifies the word integral.

Theorem—The dual J(X, Y) of $X \widehat{\otimes}_{\epsilon} Y$ consists of exactly of the continuous bilinear forms u on $X \times Y$ of the form

$$u(x,y) = \int_{S \times T} \langle x, x'\rangle \langle y, y' \rangle\; d \mu\!\left( x', y' \right),$$

where S and T are respectively some weakly closed and equicontinuous (hence weakly compact) subsets of the duals $X^{\prime}$ and $Y^{\prime}$, and $\mu$ is a (necessarily bounded) positive Radon measure on the (compact) set $S \times T$.

There is also a closely related formulation of the theorem above that can also be used to explain the terminology integral bilinear form: a continuous bilinear form $u$ on the product $X\times Y$ of locally convex spaces is integral if and only if there is a compact topological space $\Omega$ equipped with a (necessarily bounded) positive Radon measure $\mu$ and continuous linear maps $\alpha$ and $\beta$ from $X$ and $Y$ to the Banach space $L^{\infty}(\Omega,\mu)$ such that

$$u(x,y) = \langle\alpha(x),\beta(y)\rangle = \int_{\Omega}\alpha(x)\beta(y)\;d\mu$$,

i.e., the form $u$ can be realised by integrating (essentially bounded) functions on a compact space.

== Integral linear maps ==
A continuous linear map $\kappa : X \to Y'$ is called integral if its associated bilinear form is an integral bilinear form, where this form is defined by $(x, y) \in X \times Y \mapsto (\kappa x)(y)$. It follows that an integral map $\kappa : X \to Y'$ is of the form:

$$x \in X \mapsto \kappa(x) = \int_{S \times T} \left\langle x', x \right\rangle y' \mathrm{d} \mu\! \left( x', y' \right)$$

for suitable weakly closed and equicontinuous subsets S and T of $X'$ and $Y'$, respectively, and some positive Radon measure $\mu$ of total mass ≤ 1. The above integral is the weak integral, so the equality holds if and only if for every $y \in Y$, $\left\langle \kappa(x), y \right\rangle = \int_{S \times T} \left\langle x', x \right\rangle \left\langle y', y \right\rangle \mathrm{d} \mu\! \left( x', y' \right)$.

Given a linear map $\Lambda : X \to Y$, one can define a canonical bilinear form $B_{\Lambda} \in Bi\left(X, Y' \right)$, called the associated bilinear form on $X \times Y'$, by $B_{\Lambda}\left( x, y' \right) := \left( y' \circ \Lambda \right) \left( x \right)$. A continuous map $\Lambda : X \to Y$ is called integral if its associated bilinear form is an integral bilinear form. An integral map $\Lambda: X \to Y$ is of the form, for every $x \in X$ and $y' \in Y'$:

$$\left\langle y', \Lambda(x) \right\rangle = \int_{A' \times B''} \left\langle x', x \right\rangle \left\langle y'', y' \right\rangle \mathrm{d} \mu\! \left( x', y'' \right)$$

for suitable weakly closed and equicontinuous aubsets $A'$ and $B''$ of $X'$ and $Y''$, respectively, and some positive Radon measure $\mu$ of total mass $\leq 1$.

=== Relation to Hilbert spaces ===
The following result shows that integral maps "factor through" Hilbert spaces.

Proposition: Suppose that $u : X \to Y$ is an integral map between locally convex TVS with Y Hausdorff and complete. There exists a Hilbert space H and two continuous linear mappings $\alpha : X \to H$ and $\beta : H \to Y$ such that $u = \beta \circ \alpha$.

Furthermore, every integral operator between two Hilbert spaces is nuclear. Thus a continuous linear operator between two Hilbert spaces is nuclear if and only if it is integral.

=== Sufficient conditions ===
Every nuclear map is integral. An important partial converse is that every integral operator between two Hilbert spaces is nuclear.

Suppose that A, B, C, and D are Hausdorff locally convex TVSs and that $\alpha : A \to B$, $\beta : B \to C$, and $\gamma: C \to D$ are all continuous linear operators. If $\beta : B \to C$ is an integral operator then so is the composition $\gamma \circ \beta \circ \alpha : A \to D$.

If $u : X \to Y$ is a continuous linear operator between two normed space then $u : X \to Y$ is integral if and only if ${}^{t}u : Y' \to X'$ is integral.

Suppose that $u : X \to Y$ is a continuous linear map between locally convex TVSs. If $u : X \to Y$ is integral then so is its transpose ${}^{t}u : Y^{\prime}_b \to X^{\prime}_b$. Now suppose that the transpose ${}^{t}u : Y^{\prime}_b \to X^{\prime}_b$ of the continuous linear map $u : X \to Y$ is integral. Then $u : X \to Y$ is integral if the canonical injections $\operatorname{In}_X : X \to X''$ (defined by $x \mapsto$ value at x) and $\operatorname{In}_Y : Y \to Y''$ are TVS-embeddings (which happens if, for instance, $X$ and $Y^{\prime}_b$ are barreled or metrizable).

=== Properties ===
Suppose that A, B, C, and D are Hausdorff locally convex TVSs with B and D complete. If $\alpha : A \to B$, $\beta : B \to C$, and $\gamma: C \to D$ are all integral linear maps then their composition $\gamma \circ \beta \circ \alpha : A \to D$ is nuclear. Thus, in particular, if X is an infinite-dimensional Fréchet space then a continuous linear surjection $u : X \to X$ cannot be an integral operator.

== See also ==
- Auxiliary normed spaces
- Final topology
- Injective tensor product
- Nuclear operators
- Nuclear spaces
- Projective tensor product
- Topological tensor product

== Bibliography ==
- Diestel, Joe (2008). The Metric Theory of Tensor Products: Grothendieck's Résumé Revisited. Vol. 16. Providence, R.I.: American Mathematical Society. ISBN 9781470424831. OCLC 185095773.
- Dubinsky, Ed (1979). The Structure of Nuclear Fréchet Spaces. Lecture Notes in Mathematics. Vol. 720. Berlin New York: Springer-Verlag. ISBN 978-3-540-09504-0. OCLC 5126156.
- Grothendieck, Alexander (1955). "Produits Tensoriels Topologiques et Espaces Nucléaires" [Topological Tensor Products and Nuclear Spaces]. Memoirs of the American Mathematical Society Series (in French). 16. Providence: American Mathematical Society. ISBN 978-0-8218-1216-7. MR 0075539. OCLC 1315788.
- Husain, Taqdir; Khaleelulla, S. M. (1978). Barrelledness in Topological and Ordered Vector Spaces. Lecture Notes in Mathematics. Vol. 692. Berlin, New York, Heidelberg: Springer-Verlag. ISBN 978-3-540-09096-0. OCLC 4493665.
- Khaleelulla, S. M. (1982). Counterexamples in Topological Vector Spaces. Lecture Notes in Mathematics. Vol. 936. Berlin, Heidelberg, New York: Springer-Verlag. ISBN 978-3-540-11565-6. OCLC 8588370.
- Narici, Lawrence; Beckenstein, Edward (2011). Topological Vector Spaces. Pure and applied mathematics (Second ed.). Boca Raton, FL: CRC Press. ISBN 978-1584888666. OCLC 144216834.
- Hogbe-Nlend, Henri (1977). Bornologies and Functional Analysis: Introductory Course on the Theory of Duality Topology-Bornology and its use in Functional Analysis. North-Holland Mathematics Studies. Vol. 26. Amsterdam New York New York: North Holland. ISBN 978-0-08-087137-0. MR 0500064. OCLC 316549583.
- Hogbe-Nlend, Henri; Moscatelli, V. B. (1981). Nuclear and Conuclear Spaces: Introductory Course on Nuclear and Conuclear Spaces in the Light of the Duality "topology-bornology". North-Holland Mathematics Studies. Vol. 52. Amsterdam New York New York: North Holland. ISBN 978-0-08-087163-9. OCLC 316564345.
- Pietsch, Albrecht (1979). Nuclear Locally Convex Spaces. Ergebnisse der Mathematik und ihrer Grenzgebiete. Vol. 66 (Second ed.). Berlin, New York: Springer-Verlag. ISBN 978-0-387-05644-9. OCLC 539541.
- Robertson, Alex P.; Robertson, Wendy J. (1980). Topological Vector Spaces. Cambridge Tracts in Mathematics. Vol. 53. Cambridge England: Cambridge University Press. ISBN 978-0-521-29882-7. OCLC 589250.
- Rudin, Walter (1991). Functional Analysis. International Series in Pure and Applied Mathematics. Vol. 8 (Second ed.). New York, NY: McGraw-Hill Science/Engineering/Math. ISBN 978-0-07-054236-5. OCLC 21163277.
- Ryan, Raymond A. (2002). Introduction to Tensor Products of Banach Spaces. Springer Monographs in Mathematics. London New York: Springer. ISBN 978-1-85233-437-6. OCLC 48092184.
- Schaefer, Helmut H.; Wolff, Manfred P. (1999). Topological Vector Spaces. GTM. Vol. 8 (Second ed.). New York, NY: Springer New York Imprint Springer. ISBN 978-1-4612-7155-0. OCLC 840278135.
- Trèves, François (2006) [1967]. Topological Vector Spaces, Distributions and Kernels. Mineola, N.Y.: Dover Publications. ISBN 978-0-486-45352-1. OCLC 853623322.
- Wong, Yau-Chuen (1979). Schwartz Spaces, Nuclear Spaces, and Tensor Products. Lecture Notes in Mathematics. Vol. 726. Berlin New York: Springer-Verlag. ISBN 978-3-540-09513-2. OCLC 5126158.
