= Lecture Notes =

Lecture Notes may refer to the following book series, published by Springer Science+Business Media

- Lecture Notes in Computer Science
- Lecture Notes in Mathematics
- Lecture Notes in Physics
