= Auxiliary normed space =

In functional analysis, a branch of mathematics, two methods of constructing normed spaces from disks were systematically employed by Alexander Grothendieck to define nuclear operators and nuclear spaces. One method is used if the disk $D$ is bounded: in this case, the auxiliary normed space is $\operatorname{span} D$ with norm
$$p_D(x) := \inf_{x \in r D, r > 0} r.$$
The other method is used if the disk $D$ is absorbing: in this case, the auxiliary normed space is the quotient space $X / p_D^{-1}(0).$ If the disk is both bounded and absorbing then the two auxiliary normed spaces are canonically isomorphic (as topological vector spaces and as normed spaces).

== Induced by a bounded disk – Banach disks ==
Throughout this article, $X$ will be a real or complex vector space (not necessarily a TVS, yet) and $D$ will be a disk in $X.$

=== Seminormed space induced by a disk ===
Let $X$ will be a real or complex vector space. For any subset $D$ of $X,$ the Minkowski functional of $D$ defined by:

- If $D = \varnothing$ then define $p_{\varnothing}(x) : \{0\} \to [0, \infty)$ to be the trivial map $p_{\varnothing} = 0$ and it will be assumed that $\operatorname{span} \varnothing = \{0\}.$ (Note: This is the smallest vector space containing $\varnothing.$ Alternatively, if $D = \varnothing$ then $D$ may instead be replaced with $\{0\}.$)
- If $D \neq \varnothing$ and if $D$ is absorbing in $\operatorname{span} D$ then denote the Minkowski functional of $D$ in $\operatorname{span} D$ by
  $$p_D : \operatorname{span} D \to [0, \infty)$$
  where for all $x \in \operatorname{span} D,$ this is defined by
  $$p_D (x) := \inf_{} \{r : x \in r D, r > 0\}.$$

Let $X$ will be a real or complex vector space. For any subset $D$ of $X$ such that the Minkowski functional $p_D$ is a seminorm on $\operatorname{span} D,$ let $X_D$ denote
$$X_D := \left(\operatorname{span} D, p_D\right)$$
which is called the seminormed space induced by $D,$ where if $p_D$ is a norm then it is called the normed space induced by $D.$

Assumption (Topology): $X_D = \operatorname{span} D$ is endowed with the seminorm topology induced by $p_D,$ which will be denoted by $\tau_D$ or $\tau_{p_D}$

Importantly, this topology stems entirely from the set $D,$ the algebraic structure of $X,$ and the usual topology on $\R$ (since $p_D$ is defined using only the set $D$ and scalar multiplication). This justifies the study of Banach disks and is part of the reason why they play an important role in the theory of nuclear operators and nuclear spaces.

The inclusion map $\operatorname{In}_D : X_D \to X$ is called the canonical map.

Suppose that $D$ is a disk. Then $\operatorname{span} D = \bigcup_{n=1}^{\infty} n D$ so that $D$ is absorbing in $\operatorname{span} D,$ the linear span of $D.$ The set $\{r D : r > 0\}$ of all positive scalar multiples of $D$ forms a basis of neighborhoods at the origin for a locally convex topological vector space topology $\tau_D$ on $\operatorname{span} D.$ The Minkowski functional of the disk $D$ in $\operatorname{span} D$ guarantees that $p_D$ is well-defined and forms a seminorm on $\operatorname{span} D.$ The locally convex topology induced by this seminorm is the topology $\tau_D$ that was defined before.

=== Banach disk definition ===
A bounded disk $D$ in a topological vector space $X$ such that $\left(X_D, p_D\right)$ is a Banach space is called a Banach disk, infracomplete, or a bounded completant in $X.$

If its shown that $\left(\operatorname{span} D, p_D\right)$ is a Banach space then $D$ will be a Banach disk in any TVS that contains $D$ as a bounded subset.

This is because the Minkowski functional $p_D$ is defined in purely algebraic terms. Consequently, the question of whether or not $\left(X_D, p_D\right)$ forms a Banach space is dependent only on the disk $D$ and the Minkowski functional $p_D,$ and not on any particular TVS topology that $X$ may carry. Thus the requirement that a Banach disk in a TVS $X$ be a bounded subset of $X$ is the only property that ties a Banach disk's topology to the topology of its containing TVS $X.$

=== Properties of disk induced seminormed spaces ===
Bounded disks

The following result explains why Banach disks are required to be bounded.

Theorem—If $D$ is a disk in a topological vector space (TVS) $X,$ then $D$ is bounded in $X$ if and only if the inclusion map $\operatorname{In}_D : X_D \to X$ is continuous.

Proof

If the disk $D$ is bounded in the TVS $X$ then for all neighborhoods $U$ of the origin in $X,$ there exists some $r > 0$ such that $r D \subseteq U \cap X_D.$ It follows that in this case the topology of $\left(X_D, p_D\right)$ is finer than the subspace topology that $X_D$ inherits from $X,$ which implies that the inclusion map $\operatorname{In}_D : X_D \to X$ is continuous. Conversely, if $X$ has a TVS topology such that $\operatorname{In}_D : X_D \to X$ is continuous, then for every neighborhood $U$ of the origin in $X$ there exists some $r > 0$ such that $r D \subseteq U \cap X_D,$ which shows that $D$ is bounded in $X.$

Hausdorffness

The space $\left(X_D, p_D\right)$ is Hausdorff if and only if $p_D$ is a norm, which happens if and only if $D$ does not contain any non-trivial vector subspace. In particular, if there exists a Hausdorff TVS topology on $X$ such that $D$ is bounded in $X$ then $p_D$ is a norm. An example where $X_D$ is not Hausdorff is obtained by letting $X = \R^2$ and letting $D$ be the $x$-axis.

Convergence of nets

Suppose that $D$ is a disk in $X$ such that $X_D$ is Hausdorff and let $x_\bull = \left(x_i\right)_{i \in I}$ be a net in $X_D.$ Then $x_\bull \to 0$ in $X_D$ if and only if there exists a net $r_\bull = \left(r_i\right)_{i \in I}$ of real numbers such that $r_\bull \to 0$ and $x_i \in r_i D$ for all $i$; moreover, in this case it will be assumed without loss of generality that $r_i \geq 0$ for all $i.$

Relationship between disk-induced spaces

If $C \subseteq D \subseteq X$ then $\operatorname{span} C \subseteq \operatorname{span} D$ and $p_D \leq p_C$ on $\operatorname{span} C,$ so define the following continuous linear map:

If $C$ and $D$ are disks in $X$ with $C \subseteq D$ then call the inclusion map $\operatorname{In}_C^D : X_C \to X_D$ the canonical inclusion of $X_C$ into $X_D.$

In particular, the subspace topology that $\operatorname{span} C$ inherits from $\left(X_D, p_D\right)$ is weaker than $\left(X_C, p_C\right)$'s seminorm topology.

The disk as the closed unit ball

The disk $D$ is a closed subset of $\left(X_D, p_D\right)$ if and only if $D$ is the closed unit ball of the seminorm $p_D$; that is, $D = \left\{x \in \operatorname{span} D : p_D(x) \leq 1\right\}.$

If $D$ is a disk in a vector space $X$ and if there exists a TVS topology $\tau$ on $\operatorname{span} D$ such that $D$ is a closed and bounded subset of $\left(\operatorname{span} D, \tau\right),$ then $D$ is the closed unit ball of $\left(X_D, p_D\right)$ (that is, $D = \left\{x \in \operatorname{span} D : p_D(x) \leq 1\right\}$ ) (see footnote for proof). (Note: Assume WLOG that $X = \operatorname{span} D.$ Since $D$ is closed in $(X, \tau),$ it is also closed in $\left(X_D, p_D\right)$ and since the seminorm $p_D$ is the Minkowski functional of $D,$ which is continuous on $\left(X_D, p_D\right),$ it follows Narici & Beckenstein (2011, pp. 119–120) that $D$ is the closed unit ball in $\left(X_D, p\right).$)

=== Sufficient conditions for a Banach disk ===
The following theorem may be used to establish that $\left(X_D, p_D\right)$ is a Banach space. Once this is established, $D$ will be a Banach disk in any TVS in which $D$ is bounded.

Theorem—Let $D$ be a disk in a vector space $X.$ If there exists a Hausdorff TVS topology $\tau$ on $\operatorname{span} D$ such that $D$ is a bounded sequentially complete subset of $(\operatorname{span} D, \tau),$ then $\left(X_D, p_D\right)$ is a Banach space.

Proof

Assume without loss of generality that $X = \operatorname{span} D$ and let $p := p_D$ be the Minkowski functional of $D.$ Since $D$ is a bounded subset of a Hausdorff TVS, $D$ do not contain any non-trivial vector subspace, which implies that $p$ is a norm. Let $\tau_D$ denote the norm topology on $X$ induced by $p$ where since $D$ is a bounded subset of $(X, \tau),$ $\tau_D$ is finer than $\tau.$

Because $D$ is convex and balanced, for any $0 < m < n$

$$2^{-(n+1)} D + \cdots + 2^{-(m+2)} D = 2^{-(m+1)} \left(1 - 2^{m-n}\right) D \subseteq 2^{-(m+2)} D.$$

Let $x_{\bull} = \left(x_i\right)_{i=1}^{\infty}$ be a Cauchy sequence in $\left(X_D, p\right).$ By replacing $x_{\bull}$ with a subsequence, we may assume without loss of generality^{†} that for all $i,$
$$x_{i+1} - x_i \in \frac{1}{2^{i+2}} D.$$

This implies that for any $0 < m < n,$
$$x_n - x_m = \left(x_n - x_{n-1}\right) + \left(x_{m+1} - x_m\right) \in 2^{-(n+1)} D + \cdots + 2^{-(m+2)} D \subseteq 2^{-(m+2)} D$$
so that in particular, by taking $m = 1$ it follows that $x_{\bull}$ is contained in $x_1 + 2^{-3} D.$ Since $\tau_D$ is finer than $\tau,$ $x_{\bull}$ is a Cauchy sequence in $(X, \tau).$ For all $m > 0,$ $2^{-(m+2)} D$ is a Hausdorff sequentially complete subset of $(X, \tau).$ In particular, this is true for $x_1 + 2^{-3} D$ so there exists some $x \in x_1 + 2^{-3} D$ such that $x_{\bull} \to x$ in $(X, \tau).$

Since $x_n - x_m \in 2^{-(m+2)} D$ for all $0 < m < n,$ by fixing $m$ and taking the limit (in $(X, \tau)$) as $n \to \infty,$ it follows that $x - x_m \in 2^{-(m+2)} D$ for each $m > 0.$ This implies that $p\left(x - x_m\right) \to 0$ as $m \to \infty,$ which says exactly that $x_{\bull} \to x$ in $\left(X_D, p\right).$ This shows that $\left(X_D, p\right)$ is complete.

^{†}This assumption is allowed because $x_{\bull}$ is a Cauchy sequence in a metric space (so the limits of all subsequences are equal) and a sequence in a metric space converges if and only if every subsequence has a sub-subsequence that converges.

Note that even if $D$ is not a bounded and sequentially complete subset of any Hausdorff TVS, one might still be able to conclude that $\left(X_D, p_D\right)$ is a Banach space by applying this theorem to some disk $K$ satisfying
$$\left\{x \in \operatorname{span} D : p_D(x) < 1\right\} \subseteq K \subseteq \left\{x \in \operatorname{span} D : p_D(x) \leq 1\right\}$$
because $p_D = p_K.$

The following are consequences of the above theorem:

- A sequentially complete bounded disk in a Hausdorff TVS is a Banach disk.
- Any disk in a Hausdorff TVS that is complete and bounded (e.g. compact) is a Banach disk.
- The closed unit ball in a Fréchet space is sequentially complete and thus a Banach disk.

Suppose that $D$ is a bounded disk in a TVS $X.$

- If $L : X \to Y$ is a continuous linear map and $B \subseteq X$ is a Banach disk, then $L(B)$ is a Banach disk and $L\big\vert_{X_B} : X_B \to L\left(X_B\right)$ induces an isometric TVS-isomorphism $Y_{L(B)} \cong X_B / \left(X_B \cap \operatorname{ker} L\right).$

=== Properties of Banach disks ===
Let $X$ be a TVS and let $D$ be a bounded disk in $X.$

If $D$ is a bounded Banach disk in a Hausdorff locally convex space $X$ and if $T$ is a barrel in $X$ then $T$ absorbs $D$ (that is, there is a number $r > 0$ such that $D \subseteq r T.$

If $U$ is a convex balanced closed neighborhood of the origin in $X$ then the collection of all neighborhoods $r U,$ where $r > 0$ ranges over the positive real numbers, induces a topological vector space topology on $X.$ When $X$ has this topology, it is denoted by $X_U.$ Since this topology is not necessarily Hausdorff nor complete, the completion of the Hausdorff space $X / p_U^{-1}(0)$ is denoted by $\overline{X_U}$ so that $\overline{X_U}$ is a complete Hausdorff space and $p_U(x) := \inf_{x \in r U, r > 0} r$ is a norm on this space making $\overline{X_U}$ into a Banach space. The polar of $U,$ $U^{\circ},$ is a weakly compact bounded equicontinuous disk in $X^{\prime}$ and so is infracomplete.

If $X$ is a metrizable locally convex TVS then for every bounded subset $B$ of $X,$ there exists a bounded disk $D$ in $X$ such that $B \subseteq X_D,$ and both $X$ and $X_D$ induce the same subspace topology on $B.$

== Induced by a radial disk – quotient ==
Suppose that $X$ is a topological vector space and $V$ is a convex balanced and radial set. Then $\left\{\tfrac{1}{n} V : n = 1, 2, \ldots\right\}$ is a neighborhood basis at the origin for some locally convex topology $\tau_V$ on $X.$ This TVS topology $\tau_V$ is given by the Minkowski functional formed by $V,$ $p_V : X \to \R,$ which is a seminorm on $X$ defined by $p_V(x) := \inf_{x \in r V, r > 0} r.$ The topology $\tau_V$ is Hausdorff if and only if $p_V$ is a norm, or equivalently, if and only if $X / p_V^{-1}(0) = \{0\}$ or equivalently, for which it suffices that $V$ be bounded in $X.$ The topology $\tau_V$ need not be Hausdorff but $X / p_V^{-1}(0)$ is Hausdorff. A norm on $X / p_V^{-1}(0)$ is given by $\left\|x + X / p_V^{-1}(0)\right\| := p_V(x),$ where this value is in fact independent of the representative of the equivalence class $x + X / p_V^{-1}(0)$ chosen. The normed space $\left(X / p_V^{-1}(0), \| \cdot \|\right)$ is denoted by $X_V$ and its completion is denoted by $\overline{X_V}.$

If in addition $V$ is bounded in $X$ then the seminorm $p_V : X \to \R$ is a norm so in particular, $p_V^{-1}(0) = \{0\}.$ In this case, we take $X_V$ to be the vector space $X$ instead of $X / \{0\}$ so that the notation $X_V$ is unambiguous (whether $X_V$ denotes the space induced by a radial disk or the space induced by a bounded disk).

The quotient topology $\tau_Q$ on $X / p_V^{-1}(0)$ (inherited from $X$'s original topology) is finer (in general, strictly finer) than the norm topology.

=== Canonical maps ===
The canonical map is the quotient map $q_V : X \to X_V = X / p_V^{-1}(0),$ which is continuous when $X_V$ has either the norm topology or the quotient topology.

If $U$ and $V$ are radial disks such that $U \subseteq V$ then $p_U^{-1}(0) \subseteq p_V^{-1}(0)$ so there is a continuous linear surjective canonical map $q_{V,U} : X / p_U^{-1}(0) \to X / p_V^{-1}(0) = X_V$ defined by sending $x + p_U^{-1}(0) \in X_U = X / p_U^{-1}(0)$ to the equivalence class $x + p_V^{-1}(0),$ where one may verify that the definition does not depend on the representative of the equivalence class $x + p_U^{-1}(0)$ that is chosen. This canonical map has norm $\,\leq 1$ and it has a unique continuous linear canonical extension to $\overline{X_U}$ that is denoted by $\overline{g_{V,U}} : \overline{X_U} \to \overline{X_V}.$

Suppose that in addition $B \neq \varnothing$ and $C$ are bounded disks in $X$ with $B \subseteq C$ so that $X_B \subseteq X_C$ and the inclusion $\operatorname{In}_B^C : X_B \to X_C$ is a continuous linear map. Let $\operatorname{In}_B : X_B \to X,$ $\operatorname{In}_C : X_C \to X,$ and $\operatorname{In}_B^C : X_B \to X_C$ be the canonical maps. Then $\operatorname{In}_C = \operatorname{In}_B^C \circ \operatorname{In}_C : X_B \to X_C$ and $q_V = q_{V,U} \circ q_U.$

== Induced by a bounded radial disk ==
Suppose that $S$ is a bounded radial disk. Since $S$ is a bounded disk, if $D := S$ then we may create the auxiliary normed space $X_D = \operatorname{span} D$ with norm $p_D(x) := \inf_{x \in r D, r > 0} r$; since $S$ is radial, $X_S = X.$ Since $S$ is a radial disk, if $V := S$ then we may create the auxiliary seminormed space $X / p_V^{-1}(0)$ with the seminorm $p_V(x) := \inf_{x \in r V, r > 0} r$; because $S$ is bounded, this seminorm is a norm and $p_V^{-1}(0) = \{0\}$ so $X / p_V^{-1}(0) = X / \{0\} = X.$ Thus, in this case the two auxiliary normed spaces produced by these two different methods result in the same normed space.

== Duality ==
Suppose that $H$ is a weakly closed equicontinuous disk in $X^{\prime}$ (this implies that $H$ is weakly compact) and let
$$U := H^{\circ} = \{x \in X : |h(x)| \leq 1 \text{ for all } h \in H\}$$
be the polar of $H.$ Because $U^\circ = H^{\circ\circ} = H$ by the bipolar theorem, it follows that a continuous linear functional $f$ belongs to $X^{\prime}_H = \operatorname{span} H$ if and only if $f$ belongs to the continuous dual space of $\left(X, p_U\right),$ where $p_U$ is the Minkowski functional of $U$ defined by $p_U(x) := \inf_{x \in r U, r > 0} r.$

== Related concepts ==
A disk in a TVS is called infrabornivorous if it absorbs all Banach disks.

A linear map between two TVSs is called infrabounded if it maps Banach disks to bounded disks.

=== Fast convergence ===
A sequence $x_\bull = \left(x_i\right)_{i=1}^\infty$ in a TVS $X$ is said to be fast convergent to a point $x \in X$ if there exists a Banach disk $D$ such that both $x$ and the sequence is (eventually) contained in $\operatorname{span} D$ and $x_\bull \to x$ in $\left(X_D, p_D\right).$

Every fast convergent sequence is Mackey convergent.

== See also ==
- Bornological space – Space where bounded operators are continuous
- Injective tensor product
- Locally convex topological vector space – Vector space with a topology defined by convex open sets
- Nuclear operator – Linear operator related to topological vector spaces
- Nuclear space – A generalization of finite-dimensional Euclidean spaces different from Hilbert spaces
- Initial topology – Coarsest topology making certain functions continuous
- Projective tensor product – tensor product defined on two topological vector spaces
- Schwartz topological vector space – topological vector space whose neighborhoods of the origin have a property similar to the definition of totally bounded subsets
- Tensor product of Hilbert spaces – Tensor product space endowed with a special inner product
- Topological tensor product – Tensor product constructions for topological vector spaces
- Ultrabornological space

== Bibliography ==
- Burzyk, Józef; Gilsdorf, Thomas E. (1995). "Some remarks about Mackey convergence" (PDF). International Journal of Mathematics and Mathematical Sciences. 18 (4). Hindawi Limited: 659–664. doi:10.1155/s0161171295000846. ISSN 0161-1712.
- Diestel, Joe (2008). The Metric Theory of Tensor Products: Grothendieck's Résumé Revisited. Vol. 16. Providence, R.I.: American Mathematical Society. ISBN 9781470424831. OCLC 185095773.
- Dubinsky, Ed (1979). The Structure of Nuclear Fréchet Spaces. Lecture Notes in Mathematics. Vol. 720. Berlin New York: Springer-Verlag. ISBN 978-3-540-09504-0. OCLC 5126156.
- Grothendieck, Alexander (1955). "Produits Tensoriels Topologiques et Espaces Nucléaires" [Topological Tensor Products and Nuclear Spaces]. Memoirs of the American Mathematical Society Series (in French). 16. Providence: American Mathematical Society. MR 0075539. OCLC 9308061.
- Hogbe-Nlend, Henri (1977). Bornologies and Functional Analysis: Introductory Course on the Theory of Duality Topology-Bornology and its use in Functional Analysis. North-Holland Mathematics Studies. Vol. 26. Amsterdam New York New York: North Holland. ISBN 978-0-08-087137-0. MR 0500064. OCLC 316549583.
- Hogbe-Nlend, Henri; Moscatelli, V. B. (1981). Nuclear and Conuclear Spaces: Introductory Course on Nuclear and Conuclear Spaces in the Light of the Duality "topology-bornology". North-Holland Mathematics Studies. Vol. 52. Amsterdam New York New York: North Holland. ISBN 978-0-08-087163-9. OCLC 316564345.
- Husain, Taqdir; Khaleelulla, S. M. (1978). Barrelledness in Topological and Ordered Vector Spaces. Lecture Notes in Mathematics. Vol. 692. Berlin, New York, Heidelberg: Springer-Verlag. ISBN 978-3-540-09096-0. OCLC 4493665.
- Khaleelulla, S. M. (1982). Counterexamples in Topological Vector Spaces. Lecture Notes in Mathematics. Vol. 936. Berlin, Heidelberg, New York: Springer-Verlag. ISBN 978-3-540-11565-6. OCLC 8588370.
- Narici, Lawrence; Beckenstein, Edward (2011). Topological Vector Spaces. Pure and applied mathematics (Second ed.). Boca Raton, FL: CRC Press. ISBN 978-1584888666. OCLC 144216834.
- Pietsch, Albrecht (1979). Nuclear Locally Convex Spaces. Ergebnisse der Mathematik und ihrer Grenzgebiete. Vol. 66 (Second ed.). Berlin, New York: Springer-Verlag. ISBN 978-0-387-05644-9. OCLC 539541.
- Robertson, Alex P.; Robertson, Wendy J. (1980). Topological Vector Spaces. Cambridge Tracts in Mathematics. Vol. 53. Cambridge England: Cambridge University Press. ISBN 978-0-521-29882-7. OCLC 589250.
- Ryan, Raymond A. (2002). Introduction to Tensor Products of Banach Spaces. Springer Monographs in Mathematics. London New York: Springer. ISBN 978-1-85233-437-6. OCLC 48092184.
- Schaefer, Helmut H.; Wolff, Manfred P. (1999). Topological Vector Spaces. GTM. Vol. 8 (Second ed.). New York, NY: Springer New York Imprint Springer. ISBN 978-1-4612-7155-0. OCLC 840278135.
- Trèves, François (2006) [1967]. Topological Vector Spaces, Distributions and Kernels. Mineola, N.Y.: Dover Publications. ISBN 978-0-486-45352-1. OCLC 853623322.
- Wong, Yau-Chuen (1979). Schwartz Spaces, Nuclear Spaces, and Tensor Products. Lecture Notes in Mathematics. Vol. 726. Berlin New York: Springer-Verlag. ISBN 978-3-540-09513-2. OCLC 5126158.
