= Nuclear operator =

Linear operator related to topological vector spaces

In mathematics, nuclear operators are an important class of linear operators introduced by Alexander Grothendieck in his doctoral dissertation. Nuclear operators are intimately tied to the projective tensor product of two topological vector spaces (TVSs).

== Preliminaries and notation ==
Throughout let X,Y, and Z be topological vector spaces (TVSs) and L : X → Y be a linear operator (no assumption of continuity is made unless otherwise stated).

- The projective tensor product of two locally convex TVSs X and Y is denoted by $X \otimes_{\pi} Y$ and the completion of this space will be denoted by $X \widehat{\otimes}_{\pi} Y$.
- L : X → Y is a topological homomorphism or homomorphism, if it is linear, continuous, and $L : X \to \operatorname{Im} L$ is an open map, where $\operatorname{Im} L$, the image of L, has the subspace topology induced by Y.
  - If S is a subspace of X then both the quotient map X → X/S and the canonical injection S → X are homomorphisms.
- The set of continuous linear maps X → Z (resp. continuous bilinear maps $X \times Y \to Z$) will be denoted by L(X, Z) (resp. B(X, Y; Z)) where if Z is the underlying scalar field then we may instead write L(X) (resp. B(X, Y)).
- Any linear map $L : X \to Y$ can be canonically decomposed as follows: $X \to X / \ker L \; \xrightarrow{L_0} \; \operatorname{Im} L \to Y$ where $L_0\left( x + \ker L \right) := L (x)$ defines a bijection called the canonical bijection associated with L.
- X* or $X'$ will denote the continuous dual space of X.
  - To increase the clarity of the exposition, we use the common convention of writing elements of $X'$ with a prime following the symbol (e.g. $x'$ denotes an element of $X'$ and not, say, a derivative and the variables x and $x'$ need not be related in any way).
- $X^{\#}$ will denote the algebraic dual space of X (which is the vector space of all linear functionals on X, whether continuous or not).
- A linear map L : H → H from a Hilbert space into itself is called positive if $\langle L(x), x \rangle \geq 0$ for every $x \in H$. In this case, there is a unique positive map r : H → H, called the square-root of L, such that $L = r \circ r$.
  - If $L : H_1 \to H_2$ is any continuous linear map between Hilbert spaces, then $L^* \circ L$ is always positive. Now let R : H → H denote its positive square-root, which is called the absolute value of L. Define $U : H_1 \to H_2$ first on $\operatorname{Im} R$ by setting $U(x) = L(x)$ for $x = R \left( x_1 \right) \in \operatorname{Im} R$ and extending $U$ continuously to $\overline{\operatorname{Im} R}$, and then define U on $\ker R$ by setting $U(x) = 0$ for $x \in \ker R$ and extend this map linearly to all of $H_1$. The map $U\big\vert_{\operatorname{Im} R} : \operatorname{Im} R \to \operatorname{Im} L$ is a surjective isometry and $L = U \circ R$.
- A linear map $\Lambda : X \to Y$ is called compact or completely continuous if there is a neighborhood U of the origin in X such that $\Lambda(U)$ is precompact in Y.

In a Hilbert space, positive compact linear operators, say L : H → H have a simple spectral decomposition discovered at the beginning of the 20th century by Fredholm and F. Riesz:

There is a sequence of positive numbers, decreasing and either finite or else converging to 0, $r_1 > r_2 > \cdots > r_k > \cdots$ and a sequence of nonzero finite dimensional subspaces $V_i$ of H (i = 1, 2, $\ldots$) with the following properties: (1) the subspaces $V_i$ are pairwise orthogonal; (2) for every i and every $x \in V_i$, $L(x) = r_i x$; and (3) the orthogonal of the subspace spanned by $\bigcup_{i} V_i$ is equal to the kernel of L.

=== Notation for topologies ===
- σ(X, X′) denotes the coarsest topology on X making every map in X′ continuous and $X_{\sigma\left(X, X'\right)}$ or $X_\sigma$ denotes X endowed with this topology.
- σ(X′, X) denotes weak-* topology on X* and $X_{\sigma\left(X', X\right)}$ or $X'_\sigma$ denotes X′ endowed with this topology.
  - Note that every $x_0 \in X$ induces a map $X' \to \mathbb{R}$ defined by $\lambda \mapsto \lambda(x_0)$. σ(X′, X) is the coarsest topology on X′ making all such maps continuous.
- b(X, X′) denotes the topology of bounded convergence on X and $X_{b\left(X, X'\right)}$ or $X_{b}$ denotes X endowed with this topology.
- b(X′, X) denotes the topology of bounded convergence on X′ or the strong dual topology on X′ and $X_{b\left(X', X\right)}$ or $X'_b$ denotes X′ endowed with this topology.
  - As usual, if X* is considered as a topological vector space but it has not been made clear what topology it is endowed with, then the topology will be assumed to be b(X′, X).

=== A canonical tensor product as a subspace of the dual of Bi(X, Y) ===
Let X and Y be vector spaces (no topology is needed yet) and let Bi(X, Y) be the space of all bilinear maps defined on $X \times Y$ and going into the underlying scalar field.

For every $(x, y) \in X \times Y$, let $\chi_{(x, y)}$ be the canonical linear form on Bi(X, Y) defined by $\chi_{(x, y)}(u) := u(x, y)$ for every u ∈ Bi(X, Y). This induces a canonical map $\chi : X \times Y \to \mathrm{Bi}(X, Y)^{\#}$ defined by $\chi(x, y) := \chi_{(x, y)}$, where $\mathrm{Bi}(X, Y)^{\#}$ denotes the algebraic dual of Bi(X, Y). If we denote the span of the range of 𝜒 by X ⊗ Y then it can be shown that X ⊗ Y together with 𝜒 forms a tensor product of X and Y (where x ⊗ y := 𝜒(x, y)). This gives us a canonical tensor product of X and Y.

If Z is any other vector space then the mapping Li(X ⊗ Y; Z) → Bi(X, Y; Z) given by u ↦ u ∘ 𝜒 is an isomorphism of vector spaces. In particular, this allows us to identify the algebraic dual of X ⊗ Y with the space of bilinear forms on X × Y. Moreover, if X and Y are locally convex topological vector spaces (TVSs) and if X ⊗ Y is given the π-topology then for every locally convex TVS Z, this map restricts to a vector space isomorphism $L(X \otimes_{\pi} Y; Z) \to B(X, Y; Z)$ from the space of continuous linear mappings onto the space of continuous bilinear mappings. In particular, the continuous dual of X ⊗ Y can be canonically identified with the space B(X, Y) of continuous bilinear forms on X × Y; furthermore, under this identification the equicontinuous subsets of B(X, Y) are the same as the equicontinuous subsets of $(X \otimes_{\pi} Y)'$.

== Nuclear operators between Banach spaces ==
There is a canonical vector space embedding $I : X' \otimes Y \to L(X; Y)$ defined by sending $z := \sum_{i}^n x_i' \otimes y_i$ to the map $x \mapsto \sum_{i}^n x_i'(x) y_i .$

Assuming that X and Y are Banach spaces, then the map $I : X'_b \otimes_{\pi} Y \to L_b(X; Y)$ has norm $1$ (to see that the norm is $\leq 1$, note that

$\| I(z) \| = \sup_{\| x \| \leq 1} \| I(z)(x) \| = \sup_{\| x \| \leq 1} \left\| \sum_{i=1}^{n} x_i'(x) y_i \right\| \leq \sup_{\| x \| \leq 1} \sum_{i=1}^{n} \left\| x_i' \right\| \|x\| \left\| y_i \right\| \leq \sum_{i=1}^{n} \left\| x_i' \right\| \left\| y_i \right\|$, so that $\left\| I(z) \right\| \leq \left\| z \right\|_{\pi}$).

Thus I has a continuous extension to a map $\hat{I} : X'_b \widehat{\otimes}_{\pi} Y \to L_b(X; Y)$. It is known that this map is not necessarily injective. The range of this map is denoted by $L^1(X; Y)$ and its elements are called nuclear operators.

$L^1(X; Y)$ is TVS-isomorphic to $\left( X'_b \widehat{\otimes}_{\pi} Y \right) / \ker \hat{I}$ and the norm on this quotient space, when transferred to elements of $L^1(X; Y)$ via the induced map $\hat{I} : \left( X'_b \widehat{\otimes}_{\pi} Y \right) / \ker \hat{I} \to L^1(X; Y)$, is called the trace-norm and is denoted by $\| \cdot \|_{\operatorname{Tr}}$. Explicitly, if $T : X \to Y$ is a nuclear operator then $\left\| T \right\|_{\operatorname{Tr}} := \inf_{z \in \hat{I}^{-1}\left( T \right)} \left\| z \right\|_{\pi}$.

=== Characterization ===
Suppose that X and Y are Banach spaces and that $N : X \to Y$ is a continuous linear operator.

- The following are equivalent:
  1. $N : X \to Y$ is nuclear.
  2. There exists a sequence $\left( x_i' \right)_{i=1}^{\infty}$ in the closed unit ball of $X'$, a sequence $\left( y_i \right)_{i=1}^{\infty}$ in the closed unit ball of $Y$, and a complex sequence $\left( c_i \right)_{i=1}^{\infty}$ such that $\sum_{i=1}^{\infty} |c_i| < \infty$ and $N$ is equal to the mapping: $N(x) = \sum_{i=1}^{\infty} c_i x'_i(x) y_i$ for all $x \in X$. Furthermore, the trace-norm $\| N \|_{\operatorname{Tr}}$ is equal to the infimum of the numbers $\sum_{i=1}^{\infty} | c_i |$ over the set of all representations of $N$ as such a series.
- If Y is reflexive then $N : X \to Y$ is a nuclear if and only if ${}^{t}N : Y'_{b} \to X'_{b}$ is nuclear, in which case $\left\| {}^{t}N \right\|_{\operatorname{Tr}} = \left\| N \right\|_{\operatorname{Tr}}$.

=== Properties ===
Let X and Y be Banach spaces and let $N : X \to Y$ be a continuous linear operator.

- If $N : X \to Y$ is a nuclear map then its transpose ${}^{t}N : Y'_{b} \to X'_{b}$ is a continuous nuclear map (when the dual spaces carry their strong dual topologies) and $\left\| {}^{t}N\right \|_{\operatorname{Tr}} \leq \left\| N \right\|_{\operatorname{Tr}}$.

== Nuclear operators between Hilbert spaces ==
Nuclear automorphisms of a Hilbert space are called trace class operators.

Let X and Y be Hilbert spaces and let N : X → Y be a continuous linear map. Suppose that $N = UR$ where R : X → X is the square-root of $N^* N$ and U : X → Y is such that $U\big\vert_{\operatorname{Im} R} : \operatorname{Im} R \to \operatorname{Im} N$ is a surjective isometry. Then N is a nuclear map if and only if R is a nuclear map; hence, to study nuclear maps between Hilbert spaces it suffices to restrict one's attention to positive self-adjoint operators R.

=== Characterizations ===
Let X and Y be Hilbert spaces and let N : X → Y be a continuous linear map whose absolute value is R : X → X. The following are equivalent:

1. N : X → Y is nuclear.
2. R : X → X is nuclear.
3. R : X → X is compact and $\operatorname{Tr} R$ is finite, in which case $\operatorname{Tr} R = \| N \|_{\operatorname{Tr}}$.
  - Here, $\operatorname{Tr} R$ is the trace of R and it is defined as follows: Since R is a continuous compact positive operator, there exists a (possibly finite) sequence $\lambda_1 > \lambda_2 > \cdots$ of positive numbers with corresponding non-trivial finite-dimensional and mutually orthogonal vector spaces $V_1, V_2, \ldots$ such that the orthogonal (in H) of $\operatorname{span}\left( V_1 \cup V_2 \cup \cdots \right)$ is equal to $\ker R$ (and hence also to $\ker N$) and for all k, $R(x) = \lambda_k x$ for all $x \in V_k$; the trace is defined as $\operatorname{Tr} R := \sum_{k} \lambda_k \dim V_k$.
4. ${}^{t}N : Y'_b \to X'_{b}$ is nuclear, in which case $\| {}^t N \|_{\operatorname{Tr}} = \| N \|_{\operatorname{Tr}}$.
5. There are two orthogonal sequences $(x_i)_{i=1}^\infty$ in X and $(y_i)_{i=1}^\infty$ in Y, and a sequence $\left( \lambda_i \right)_{i=1}^\infty$ in $\ell^1$ such that for all $x \in X$, $N(x) = \sum_i \lambda_i \langle x, x_i \rangle y_i$.
6. N : X → Y is an integral map.

== Nuclear operators between locally convex spaces ==
Suppose that U is a convex balanced closed neighborhood of the origin in X and B is a convex balanced bounded Banach disk in Y with both X and Y locally convex spaces. Let $p_U(x) = \inf_{r > 0, x \in r U} r$ and let $\pi : X \to X/p_U^{-1}(0)$ be the canonical projection. One can define the auxiliary Banach space $\hat{X}_U$ with the canonical map $\hat{\pi}_U : X \to \hat{X}_U$ whose image, $X/p_U^{-1}(0)$, is dense in $\hat{X}_U$ as well as the auxiliary space $F_B = \operatorname{span} B$ normed by $p_B(y) = \inf_{r > 0, y \in r B} r$ and with a canonical map $\iota : F_B \to F$ being the (continuous) canonical injection. Given any continuous linear map $T : \hat{X}_U \to Y_B$ one obtains through composition the continuous linear map $\hat{\pi}_U \circ T \circ \iota : X \to Y$; thus we have an injection $L \left( \hat{X}_U; Y_B \right) \to L(X; Y)$ and we henceforth use this map to identify $L \left( \hat{X}_U; Y_B \right)$ as a subspace of $L(X; Y)$.

Definition: Let X and Y be Hausdorff locally convex spaces. The union of all $L^1\left( \hat{X}_U; Y_B \right)$ as U ranges over all closed convex balanced neighborhoods of the origin in X and B ranges over all bounded Banach disks in Y, is denoted by $L^1(X; Y)$ and its elements are call nuclear mappings of X into Y.

When X and Y are Banach spaces, then this new definition of nuclear mapping is consistent with the original one given for the special case where X and Y are Banach spaces.

=== Sufficient conditions for nuclearity ===
- Let W, X, Y, and Z be Hausdorff locally convex spaces, $N : X \to Y$ a nuclear map, and $M : W \to X$ and $P : Y \to Z$ be continuous linear maps. Then $N \circ M : W \to Y$, $P \circ N : X \to Z$, and $P \circ N \circ M : W \to Z$ are nuclear and if in addition W, X, Y, and Z are all Banach spaces then $\left\| P \circ N \circ M\right\|_{\operatorname{Tr}} \leq \left\| P \right\| \left\| N \right\|_{\operatorname{Tr}} \| \left\| M \right\|$.
- If $N : X \to Y$ is a nuclear map between two Hausdorff locally convex spaces, then its transpose ${}^{t}N : Y'_{b} \to X'_{b}$ is a continuous nuclear map (when the dual spaces carry their strong dual topologies).
  - If in addition X and Y are Banach spaces, then $\left\| {}^{t}N \right\|_{\operatorname{Tr}} \leq \left\| N \right\|_{\operatorname{Tr}}$.
- If $N : X \to Y$ is a nuclear map between two Hausdorff locally convex spaces and if $\hat{X}$ is a completion of X, then the unique continuous extension $\hat{N} : \hat{X} \to Y$ of N is nuclear.

=== Characterizations ===
Let X and Y be Hausdorff locally convex spaces and let $N : X \to Y$ be a continuous linear operator.

- The following are equivalent:
  1. $N : X \to Y$ is nuclear.
  2. (Definition) There exists a convex balanced neighborhood U of the origin in X and a bounded Banach disk B in Y such that $N(U) \subseteq B$ and the induced map $\overline{N}_0 : \hat{X}_U \to Y_B$ is nuclear, where $\overline{N}_0$ is the unique continuous extension of $N_0 : X_U \to Y_B$, which is the unique map satisfying $N = \operatorname{In}_B \circ N_0 \circ \pi_U$ where $\operatorname{In}_B : Y_B \to Y$ is the natural inclusion and $\pi_U : X \to X / p_U^{-1}(0)$ is the canonical projection.
  3. There exist Banach spaces $B_1$ and $B_2$ and continuous linear maps $f : X \to B_1$, $n : B_1 \to B_2$, and $g : B_2 \to Y$ such that $n : B_1 \to B_2$ is nuclear and $N = g \circ n \circ f$.
  4. There exists an equicontinuous sequence $\left( x_i' \right)_{i=1}^{\infty}$ in $X'$, a bounded Banach disk $B \subseteq Y$, a sequence $\left( y_i \right)_{i=1}^{\infty}$ in B, and a complex sequence $\left( c_i \right)_{i=1}^{\infty}$ such that $\sum_{i=1}^{\infty} |c_i| < \infty$ and $N$ is equal to the mapping: $N(x) = \sum_{i=1}^{\infty} c_i x'_i(x) y_i$ for all $x \in X$.
- If X is barreled and Y is quasi-complete, then N is nuclear if and only if N has a representation of the form $N(x) = \sum_{i=1}^{\infty} c_i x'_i(x) y_i$ with $\left( x_i' \right)_{i=1}^{\infty}$ bounded in $X'$, $\left( y_i \right)_{i=1}^{\infty}$ bounded in Y and $\sum_{i=1}^{\infty} |c_i| < \infty$.

=== Properties ===
The following is a type of Hahn-Banach theorem for extending nuclear maps:

- If $E : X \to Z$ is a TVS-embedding and $N : X \to Y$ is a nuclear map then there exists a nuclear map $\tilde{N} : Z \to Y$ such that $\tilde{N} \circ E = N$. Furthermore, when X and Y are Banach spaces and E is an isometry then for any $\epsilon > 0$, $\tilde{N}$ can be picked so that $\| \tilde{N} \|_{\operatorname{Tr}} \leq \| N \|_{\operatorname{Tr}} + \epsilon$.
- Suppose that $E : X \to Z$ is a TVS-embedding whose image is closed in Z and let $\pi : Z \to Z / \operatorname{Im} E$ be the canonical projection. Suppose all that every compact disk in $Z / \operatorname{Im} E$ is the image under $\pi$ of a bounded Banach disk in Z (this is true, for instance, if X and Z are both Fréchet spaces, or if Z is the strong dual of a Fréchet space and $\operatorname{Im} E$ is weakly closed in Z). Then for every nuclear map $N : Y \to Z / \operatorname{Im} E$ there exists a nuclear map $\tilde{N} : Y \to Z$ such that $\pi \circ \tilde{N} = N$.
  - Furthermore, when X and Z are Banach spaces and E is an isometry then for any $\epsilon > 0$, $\tilde{N}$ can be picked so that $\left\| \tilde{N} \right\|_{\operatorname{Tr}} \leq \left\| N \right\|_{\operatorname{Tr}} + \epsilon$.

Let X and Y be Hausdorff locally convex spaces.

- Any nuclear map $N : X \to Y$ is compact.
- For every topology of uniform convergence on $L( X; Y )$, the nuclear maps are contained in the closure of $X' \otimes Y$ (when $X' \otimes Y$ is viewed as a subspace of $L( X; Y )$).

== See also ==
- Auxiliary normed spaces
- Covariance operator – Operator in probability theory
- Initial topology – Coarsest topology making certain functions continuous
- Inductive tensor product
- Injective tensor product
- Locally convex topological vector space – Space with topology generated by convex sets
- Nuclear operators between Banach spaces
- Nuclear space – Generalization of finite-dimensional Euclidean spaces different from Hilbert spaces
- Projective tensor product
- Tensor product of Hilbert spaces – Tensor product space endowed with a special inner product
- Topological tensor product – Tensor product constructions for topological vector spaces
- Trace class – Compact operator for which a finite trace can be defined
- Topological vector space – Vector space with a notion of nearness

== Bibliography ==
- Diestel, Joe (2008). The metric theory of tensor products : Grothendieck's résumé revisited. Providence, R.I: American Mathematical Society. ISBN 978-0-8218-4440-3. OCLC 185095773.
- Dubinsky, Ed (1979). The structure of nuclear Fréchet spaces. Berlin New York: Springer-Verlag. ISBN 3-540-09504-7. OCLC 5126156.
- Grothendieck, Alexander (1966). Produits tensoriels topologiques et espaces nucléaires (in French). Providence: American Mathematical Society. ISBN 0-8218-1216-5. OCLC 1315788.
- Husain, Taqdir (1978). Barrelledness in topological and ordered vector spaces. Berlin New York: Springer-Verlag. ISBN 3-540-09096-7. OCLC 4493665.
- Khaleelulla, S. M. (1982). Counterexamples in Topological Vector Spaces. Lecture Notes in Mathematics. Vol. 936. Berlin, Heidelberg, New York: Springer-Verlag. ISBN 978-3-540-11565-6. OCLC 8588370.
- Narici, Lawrence; Beckenstein, Edward (2011). Topological Vector Spaces. Pure and applied mathematics (Second ed.). Boca Raton, FL: CRC Press. ISBN 978-1584888666. OCLC 144216834.
- Nlend, H (1977). Bornologies and functional analysis : introductory course on the theory of duality topology-bornology and its use in functional analysis. Amsterdam New York New York: North-Holland Pub. Co. Sole distributors for the U.S.A. and Canada, Elsevier-North Holland. ISBN 0-7204-0712-5. OCLC 2798822.
- Nlend, H (1981). Nuclear and conuclear spaces : introductory courses on nuclear and conuclear spaces in the light of the duality. Amsterdam New York New York, N.Y: North-Holland Pub. Co. Sole distributors for the U.S.A. and Canada, Elsevier North-Holland. ISBN 0-444-86207-2. OCLC 7553061.
- Pietsch, Albrecht (1972). Nuclear locally convex spaces. Berlin, New York: Springer-Verlag. ISBN 0-387-05644-0. OCLC 539541.
- Robertson, A. P. (1973). Topological vector spaces. Cambridge England: University Press. ISBN 0-521-29882-2. OCLC 589250.
- Ryan, Raymond (2002). Introduction to tensor products of Banach spaces. London New York: Springer. ISBN 1-85233-437-1. OCLC 48092184.
- Schaefer, Helmut H.; Wolff, Manfred P. (1999). Topological Vector Spaces. GTM. Vol. 8 (Second ed.). New York, NY: Springer New York Imprint Springer. ISBN 978-1-4612-7155-0. OCLC 840278135.
- Trèves, François (2006) [1967]. Topological Vector Spaces, Distributions and Kernels. Mineola, N.Y.: Dover Publications. ISBN 978-0-486-45352-1. OCLC 853623322.
- Wong (1979). Schwartz spaces, nuclear spaces, and tensor products. Berlin New York: Springer-Verlag. ISBN 3-540-09513-6. OCLC 5126158.
