= Victor Lidskii =

Victor Borisovich Lidskii (Russian: Виктор Борисович Лидский, 4 May 1924, Odessa – 29 July 2008, Moscow) was a Soviet and Russian mathematician who worked in spectral theory, operator theory, and shell theory. Lidskii discovered the Lidskii theorem in 1959. His adviser at Moscow State University was Israel Gelfand.
