= Integral operator =

Operator that involves integration

An integral operator is an operator that involves integration. Special instances are:

- The operator of integration itself, denoted by the integral symbol
- Integral linear operators, which are linear operators induced by bilinear forms involving integrals
- Integral transforms, which are maps between two function spaces, which involve integrals
