= Nuclear space =

Generalization of finite-dimensional Euclidean spaces different from Hilbert spaces

In mathematics, nuclear spaces are topological vector spaces that can be viewed as a generalization of finite-dimensional Euclidean spaces and share many of their desirable properties. Nuclear spaces are however quite different from Hilbert spaces, another generalization of finite-dimensional Euclidean spaces. They were introduced by Alexander Grothendieck.

The topology on nuclear spaces can be defined by a family of seminorms whose unit balls decrease rapidly in size. Vector spaces whose elements are "smooth" in some sense tend to be nuclear spaces; a typical example of a nuclear space is the set of smooth functions on a compact manifold. All finite-dimensional vector spaces are nuclear. There are no Banach spaces that are nuclear, except for the finite-dimensional ones. In practice a sort of converse to this is often true: if a "naturally occurring" topological vector space is not a Banach space, then there is a good chance that it is nuclear.

== Original motivation: The Schwartz kernel theorem ==
Much of the theory of nuclear spaces was developed by Alexander Grothendieck while investigating the Schwartz kernel theorem and published in (Grothendieck 1955). We now describe this motivation.

For any open subsets $\Omega_1 \subseteq \R^m$ and $\Omega_2 \subseteq \R^n,$ the canonical map $\mathcal{D}^{\prime}\left(\Omega_1 \times \Omega_2\right) \to L_b\left(C_c^{\infty}\left(\Omega_2\right); \mathcal{D}^{\prime}\left(\Omega_1\right)\right)$ is an isomorphism of TVSs (where $L_b\left(C_c^\infty\left(\Omega_2\right); \mathcal{D}^{\prime}\left(\Omega_1\right)\right)$ has the topology of uniform convergence on bounded subsets) and furthermore, both of these spaces are canonically TVS-isomorphic to $\mathcal{D}^{\prime}\left(\Omega_1\right) \mathbin{\widehat{\otimes}} \mathcal{D}^{\prime}\left(\Omega_2\right)$ (where since $\mathcal{D}^{\prime}\left(\Omega_1\right)$ is nuclear, this tensor product is simultaneously the injective tensor product and projective tensor product). In short, the Schwartz kernel theorem states that:
$$\mathcal{D}^{\prime}\left(\Omega_1 \times \Omega_2\right)
\cong \mathcal{D}^{\prime}\left(\Omega_1\right) \mathbin{\widehat{\otimes}} \mathcal{D}^{\prime}\left(\Omega_2\right)
\cong L_b\left( C_c^{\infty}\left(\Omega_2\right); \mathcal{D}^{\prime}\left(\Omega_1\right)\right)$$
where all of these TVS-isomorphisms are canonical.

This result is false if one replaces the space $C_c^\infty$ with $L^2$ (which is a reflexive space that is even isomorphic to its own strong dual space) and replaces $\mathcal{D}^{\prime}$ with the dual of this $L^2$ space. The question of why such a nice result holds for the space of distributions and test functions but not for the Hilbert space $L^2$ (which is generally considered one of the "nicest" TVSs) led Grothendieck to discover nuclear spaces, nuclear maps, and the injective tensor product.

=== Motivations from geometry ===
Another set of motivating examples comes directly from geometry and smooth manifold theory^{appendix 2}. Given smooth manifolds $M,N$ and a locally convex Hausdorff topological vector space $F$, then there are the following isomorphisms of nuclear spaces

- $C^\infty(M) \otimes C^\infty(N) \cong C^\infty(M \times N)$
- $C^\infty(M) \otimes F \cong \{ f : M \to F : f \text{ is smooth } \}$

== Definition ==
This section lists some of the more common definitions of a nuclear space. The definitions below are all equivalent. Note that some authors use a more restrictive definition of a nuclear space, by adding the condition that the space should also be a Fréchet space. (This means that the space is complete and the topology is given by a countable family of seminorms.)

The following definition was used by Grothendieck to define nuclear spaces.

Definition 0: Let $X$ be a locally convex topological vector space. Then $X$ is nuclear if for every locally convex space $Y,$ the canonical vector space embedding $X \otimes_\pi Y \to \mathcal{B}_\varepsilon\left(X^{\prime}_\sigma, Y^{\prime}_\sigma \right)$ is an embedding of TVSs whose image is dense in the codomain (where the domain $X \otimes_\pi Y$ is the projective tensor product and the codomain is the space of all separately continuous bilinear forms on $X^{\prime}_\sigma \times Y^{\prime}_\sigma$ endowed with the topology of uniform convergence on equicontinuous subsets).

We start by recalling some background. A locally convex topological vector space $X$ has a topology that is defined by some family of seminorms. For every seminorm, the unit ball is a closed convex symmetric neighborhood of the origin, and conversely every closed convex symmetric neighborhood of 0 is the unit ball of some seminorm. (For complex vector spaces, the condition "symmetric" should be replaced by "balanced".) If $p$ is a seminorm on $X,$ then $X_p$ denotes the Banach space given by completing the auxiliary normed space using the seminorm $p.$ There is a natural map $X \to X_p$ (not necessarily injective).

If $q$ is another seminorm, larger than $p$ (pointwise as a function on $X$), then there is a natural map from $X_q$ to $X_p$ such that the first map factors as $X \to X_q \to X_p.$ These maps are always continuous. The space $X$ is nuclear when a stronger condition holds, namely that these maps are nuclear operators. The condition of being a nuclear operator is subtle, and more details are available in the corresponding article.

Definition 1: A nuclear space is a locally convex topological vector space such that for every seminorm $p$ we can find a larger seminorm $q$ so that the natural map $X_q \to X_p$ is nuclear.

Informally, this means that whenever we are given the unit ball of some seminorm, we can find a "much smaller" unit ball of another seminorm inside it, or that every neighborhood of 0 contains a "much smaller" neighborhood. It is not necessary to check this condition for all seminorms $p$; it is sufficient to check it for a set of seminorms that generate the topology, in other words, a set of seminorms that are a subbase for the topology.

Instead of using arbitrary Banach spaces and nuclear operators, we can give a definition in terms of Hilbert spaces and trace class operators, which are easier to understand. (On Hilbert spaces nuclear operators are often called trace class operators.) We will say that a seminorm $p$ is a Hilbert seminorm if $X_p$ is a Hilbert space, or equivalently if $p$ comes from a sesquilinear positive semidefinite form on $X.$

Definition 2: A nuclear space is a topological vector space with a topology defined by a family of Hilbert seminorms, such that for every Hilbert seminorm $p$ we can find a larger Hilbert seminorm $q$ so that the natural map from $X_q$ to $X_p$ is trace class.

Some authors prefer to use Hilbert–Schmidt operators rather than trace class operators. This makes little difference, because every trace class operator is Hilbert–Schmidt, and the product of two Hilbert–Schmidt operators is of trace class.

Definition 3: A nuclear space is a topological vector space with a topology defined by a family of Hilbert seminorms, such that for every Hilbert seminorm $p$ we can find a larger Hilbert seminorm $q$ so that the natural map from $X_q$ to $X_p$ is Hilbert–Schmidt.

If we are willing to use the concept of a nuclear operator from an arbitrary locally convex topological vector space to a Banach space, we can give shorter definitions as follows:

Definition 4: A nuclear space is a locally convex topological vector space such that for every seminorm $p$ the natural map from $X \to X_p$ is nuclear.

Definition 5: A nuclear space is a locally convex topological vector space such that every continuous linear map to a Banach space is nuclear.

Grothendieck used a definition similar to the following one:

Definition 6: A nuclear space is a locally convex topological vector space $A$ such that for every locally convex topological vector space $B$ the natural map from the projective to the injective tensor product of $A$ and $B$ is an isomorphism.

In fact it is sufficient to check this just for Banach spaces $B,$ or even just for the single Banach space $\ell^1$ of absolutely convergent series.

== Characterizations ==
Let $X$ be a Hausdorff locally convex space. Then the following are equivalent:

1. $X$ is nuclear;
2. for any locally convex space $Y,$ the canonical vector space embedding $X \otimes_{\pi} Y \to \mathcal{B}_{\epsilon}\left( X^{\prime}_{\sigma}, Y^{\prime}_{\sigma} \right)$ is an embedding of TVSs whose image is dense in the codomain;
3. for any Banach space $Y,$ the canonical vector space embedding $X \widehat{\otimes}_{\pi} Y \to X \widehat{\otimes}_{\epsilon} Y$ is a surjective isomorphism of TVSs;
4. for any locally convex Hausdorff space $Y,$ the canonical vector space embedding $X \widehat{\otimes}_{\pi} Y \to X \widehat{\otimes}_{\epsilon} Y$ is a surjective isomorphism of TVSs;
5. the canonical embedding of $\ell^1[\N, X]$ in $\ell^1(\N, X)$ is a surjective isomorphism of TVSs;
6. the canonical map of $\ell^1 \widehat{\otimes}_{\pi} X \to \ell^1 \widehat{\otimes}_{\epsilon} X$ is a surjective TVS-isomorphism.
7. for any seminorm $p$ we can find a larger seminorm $q$ so that the natural map $X_q \to X_p$ is nuclear;
8. for any seminorm $p$ we can find a larger seminorm $q$ so that the canonical injection $X^{\prime}_p \to X^{\prime}_q$ is nuclear;
9. the topology of $X$ is defined by a family of Hilbert seminorms, such that for any Hilbert seminorm $p$ we can find a larger Hilbert seminorm $q$ so that the natural map $X_q \to X_p$ is trace class;
10. $X$ has a topology defined by a family of Hilbert seminorms, such that for any Hilbert seminorm $p$ we can find a larger Hilbert seminorm $q$ so that the natural map $X_q \to X_p$ is Hilbert–Schmidt;
11. for any seminorm $p$ the natural map from $X \to X_p$ is nuclear.
12. any continuous linear map to a Banach space is nuclear;
13. every continuous seminorm on $X$ is prenuclear;
14. every equicontinuous subset of $X^{\prime}$ is prenuclear;
15. every linear map from a Banach space into $X^{\prime}$ that transforms the unit ball into an equicontinuous set, is nuclear;
16. the completion of $X$ is a nuclear space;

If $X$ is a Fréchet space then the following are equivalent:

1. $X$ is nuclear;
2. every unconditionally summable sequence in $X$ is absolutely summable;
3. the strong dual of $X$ is nuclear;

== Sufficient conditions ==
- A locally convex Hausdorff space is nuclear if and only if its completion is nuclear.
- Every subspace of a nuclear space is nuclear.
- Every Hausdorff quotient space of a nuclear space is nuclear.
- The inductive limit of a countable sequence of nuclear spaces is nuclear.
- The locally convex direct sum of a countable sequence of nuclear spaces is nuclear.
- The strong dual of a nuclear Fréchet space is nuclear.
  - In general, the strong dual of a nuclear space may fail to be nuclear.
- A Fréchet space whose strong dual is nuclear is itself nuclear.
- The limit of a family of nuclear spaces is nuclear.
- The product of a family of nuclear spaces is nuclear.
- The completion of a nuclear space is nuclear (and in fact a space is nuclear if and only if its completion is nuclear).
- The tensor product of two nuclear spaces is nuclear.
- The projective tensor product, as well as its completion, of two nuclear spaces is nuclear.

Suppose that $X, Y,$ and $N$ are locally convex space with $N$ is nuclear.

- If $N$ is nuclear then the vector space of continuous linear maps $L_{\sigma}(X, N)$ endowed with the topology of simple convergence is a nuclear space.
- If $X$ is a semi-reflexive space whose strong dual is nuclear and if $N$ is nuclear then the vector space of continuous linear maps $L_b(X, N)$ (endowed with the topology of uniform convergence on bounded subsets of $X$ ) is a nuclear space.

=== Examples ===
If $d$ is a set of any cardinality, then $\R^d$ and $\Complex^d$ (with the product topology) are both nuclear spaces.

A relatively simple infinite-dimensional example of a nuclear space is the space of all rapidly decreasing sequences $c = \left(c_1, c_2, \ldots \right).$ ("Rapidly decreasing" means that $c_n p(n)$ is bounded for any polynomial $p$). For each real number $s,$ it is possible to define a norm $\|\,\cdot\,\|_s$ by
$$\|c\|_s = \sup_{} \left|c_n\right| n^s$$
If the completion in this norm is $C_s,$ then there is a natural map from $C_s \to C_t$ whenever $s \geq t,$ and this is nuclear whenever $s > t + 1$ essentially because the series $\sum n^{t - s}$ is then absolutely convergent. In particular for each norm $\|\,\cdot\,\|_t$ this is possible to find another norm, say $\|\,\cdot\,\|_{t + 1},$ such that the map $C_{t+2} \to C_t$ is nuclear. So the space is nuclear.

- The space of smooth functions on any compact manifold is nuclear.
- The space of entire holomorphic functions on the complex plane is nuclear.
- Both the Schwartz space of smooth functions on $\R^n$ for which the derivatives of all orders are rapidly decreasing, and its strong dual space, the space of tempered distrutions, are nuclear.
- Both the space of test functions $\mathcal{D}(U)=C_{c}^{\infty}(U)$ and its strong dual, the space of distributions $\mathcal{D}^{\prime},$ are nuclear.

== Properties ==
Nuclear spaces are in many ways similar to finite-dimensional spaces and have many of their good properties.

- Every finite-dimensional Hausdorff space is nuclear.
- A Fréchet space is nuclear if and only if its strong dual is nuclear.
- Every bounded subset of a nuclear space is precompact (recall that a set is precompact if its closure in the completion of the space is compact). This is analogous to the Heine-Borel theorem. In contrast, no infinite-dimensional normed space has this property (although the finite-dimensional spaces do).
- If $X$ is a quasi-complete (i.e. all closed and bounded subsets are complete) nuclear space then $X$ has the Heine-Borel property.
- A nuclear quasi-complete barrelled space is a Montel space.
- Every closed equicontinuous subset of the dual of a nuclear space is a compact metrizable set (for the strong dual topology).
- Every nuclear space is a subspace of a product of Hilbert spaces.
- Every nuclear space admits a basis of seminorms consisting of Hilbert norms.
- Every nuclear space is a Schwartz space.
- Every nuclear space possesses the approximation property.
- Any subspace and any quotient space by a closed subspace of a nuclear space is nuclear.
- If $A$ is nuclear and $B$ is any locally convex topological vector space, then the natural map from the projective tensor product of A and $B$ to the injective tensor product is an isomorphism. Roughly speaking this means that there is only one sensible way to define the tensor product. This property characterizes nuclear spaces $A.$
- In the theory of measures on topological vector spaces, a basic theorem states that any continuous cylinder set measure on the dual of a nuclear Fréchet space automatically extends to a Radon measure. This is useful because it is often easy to construct cylinder set measures on topological vector spaces, but these are not good enough for most applications unless they are Radon measures (for example, they are not even countably additive in general).

=== The kernel theorem ===
Much of the theory of nuclear spaces was developed by Alexander Grothendieck while investigating the Schwartz kernel theorem and published in (Grothendieck 1955). We have the following generalization of the theorem.

Schwartz kernel theorem: Suppose that $X$ is nuclear, $Y$ is locally convex, and $v$ is a continuous bilinear form on $X \times Y.$ Then $v$ originates from a space of the form $X^{\prime}_{A^{\prime}} \widehat{\otimes}_{\epsilon} Y^{\prime}_{B^{\prime}}$ where $A^{\prime}$ and $B^{\prime}$ are suitable equicontinuous subsets of $X^{\prime}$ and $Y^{\prime}.$ Equivalently, $v$ is of the form,
$$v(x, y) = \sum_{i=1}^{\infty} \lambda_i \left\langle x, x_i^{\prime} \right\rangle \left\langle y, y_i^{\prime} \right\rangle \quad \text{ for all } (x, y) \in X \times Y$$
where $\left(\lambda_i\right) \in \ell^1$ and each of $\left\{ x^{\prime}_1, x^{\prime}_2, \ldots \right\}$ and $\left\{ y^{\prime}_1, y^{\prime}_2, \ldots \right\}$ are equicontinuous. Furthermore, these sequences can be taken to be null sequences (that is, convergent to 0) in $X^{\prime}_{A^{\prime}}$ and $Y^{\prime}_{B^{\prime}},$ respectively.

== Bochner–Minlos theorem ==
Any continuous positive-definite functional $C$ on a nuclear space $A$ is called a characteristic functional if $C(0) = 1,$ and for any $z_j\in\mathbb{C},$ $x_j \in A$ and $j, k = 1, \ldots, n,$
$$\sum_{j=1}^n \sum_{k=1}^n z_j \bar z_k C(x_j - x_k) \geq 0.$$

Given a characteristic functional on a nuclear space $A,$ the Bochner–Minlos theorem (after Salomon Bochner and Robert Adol'fovich Minlos) guarantees the existence and uniqueness of a corresponding probability measure $\mu$ on the dual space $A^{\prime}$ such that
$$C(y) = \int_{A^{\prime}} e^{i\langle x, y\rangle} \, d\mu(x),$$

where $C(y)$ is the Fourier-Stieltjes transform of $\mu$, thereby extending the inverse Fourier transform to nuclear spaces.

In particular, if $A$ is the nuclear space
$$A = \bigcap_{k=0}^\infty H_k,$$
where $H_k$ are Hilbert spaces, the Bochner–Minlos theorem guarantees the existence of a probability measure with the characteristic function $e^{-\frac{1}{2}\|y\|_{H_0}^2},$ that is, the existence of the Gaussian measure on the dual space. Such measure is called white noise measure. When $A$ is the Schwartz space, the corresponding random element is a random distribution.

== Strongly nuclear spaces ==
A strongly nuclear space is a locally convex topological vector space such that for any seminorm $p$ there exists a larger seminorm $q$ so that the natural map $X_q \to X_p$ is strongly nuclear.

== See also ==
- Auxiliary normed space
- Fredholm kernel – type of a kernel on a Banach space
- Injective tensor product
- Locally convex topological vector space – a vector space with a topology defined by convex open sets
- Nuclear operator
- Projective tensor product – a tensor product defined on two topological vector spaces
- Rigged Hilbert space – a construction linking the study of "bound" and continuous eigenvalues in functional analysis
- Trace class – the class of compact operators for which a finite trace can be defined
- Topological vector space – a vector space with a notion of nearness
