= Lecture Notes in Physics =

Book series by Springer

- Discipline: Physics
- Language: English

Publication details
- History: 1969–present
- Publisher: Springer Science+Business Media

Standard abbreviations
- ISO 4: Lect. Notes Phys.
- MathSciNet: Lecture Notes in Phys.

Indexing
- ISSN: 0075-8450

Links
- Series homepage

Lecture Notes in Physics (LNP) is a book series published by Springer Science+Business Media in the field of physics, including articles related to both research and teaching. It was established in 1969.

== See also ==
- Lecture Notes in Computer Science
- Lecture Notes in Mathematics
