= Hilbert–Schmidt operator =

Topic in mathematics

In mathematics, a Hilbert–Schmidt operator, named after David Hilbert and Erhard Schmidt, is a bounded operator $A \colon H \to H$ that acts on a Hilbert space $H$ and has finite Hilbert–Schmidt norm

$$\|A\|^2_{\operatorname{HS}} \ \stackrel{\text{def}}{=}\ \sum_{i \in I} \|Ae_i\|^2_H,$$

where $\{e_i: i \in I\}$ is an orthonormal basis. The index set $I$ need not be countable. However, the sum on the right must contain at most countably many non-zero terms, to have meaning. This definition is independent of the choice of the orthonormal basis. In finite-dimensional Euclidean space, the Hilbert–Schmidt norm $\|\cdot\|_\text{HS}$ is identical to the Frobenius norm.

== ‖·‖_{HS} is well defined ==
The Hilbert–Schmidt norm does not depend on the choice of orthonormal basis. Indeed, if $\{e_i\}_{i\in I}$ and $\{f_j\}_{j\in I}$ are such bases, then
$$\sum_i \|Ae_i\|^2 = \sum_{i,j} \left| \langle Ae_i, f_j\rangle \right|^2 = \sum_{i,j} \left| \langle e_i, A^*f_j\rangle \right|^2 = \sum_j\|A^* f_j\|^2.$$
If $e_i = f_i,$ then $\sum_i \|Ae_i\|^2 = \sum_i\|A^* e_i\|^2.$ As for any bounded operator, $A = A^{**}.$ Replacing $A$ with $A^*$ in the first formula, obtain $\sum_i \|A^* e_i\|^2 = \sum_j\|A f_j\|^2.$ The independence follows.

== Examples ==
An important class of examples is provided by Hilbert–Schmidt integral operators. Every bounded operator with a finite-dimensional range (these are called operators of finite rank) is a Hilbert–Schmidt operator. The identity operator on a Hilbert space is a Hilbert–Schmidt operator if and only if the Hilbert space is finite-dimensional. Given any $x$ and $y$ in $H$, define $x \otimes y : H \to H$ by $(x \otimes y)(z) = \langle z, y \rangle x$, which is a continuous linear operator of rank 1 and thus a Hilbert–Schmidt operator; moreover, for any bounded linear operator $A$ on $H$ (and into $H$), $\operatorname{tr}\left( A\left( x \otimes y \right) \right) = \left\langle A x, y \right\rangle$.

If $T: H \to H$ is a bounded compact operator with eigenvalues $\ell_1, \ell_2, \dots$ of $|T| := \sqrt{T^*T}$, where each eigenvalue is repeated as often as its multiplicity, then $T$ is Hilbert–Schmidt if and only if $\sum_{i=1}^{\infty} \ell_i^2 < \infty$, in which case the Hilbert–Schmidt norm of $T$ is $\left\| T \right\|_{\operatorname{HS}} = \sqrt{\sum_{i=1}^{\infty} \ell_i^2}$.

If $k \in L^2\left( X \times X \right)$, where $\left( X, \Omega, \mu \right)$ is a measure space, then the integral operator $K : L^2\left( X \right) \to L^2\left( X \right)$ with kernel $k$ is a Hilbert–Schmidt operator and $\left\| K \right\|_{\operatorname{HS}} = \left\| k \right\|_2$. Conversely, if a bounded operator on $L^2\left( X \right)$ is Hilbert-Schmidt then it may be written as an integral operator of this form.

== Space of Hilbert–Schmidt operators ==
The product of two Hilbert–Schmidt operators has finite trace-class norm; therefore, if A and B are two Hilbert–Schmidt operators, the Hilbert–Schmidt inner product can be defined as

$$\langle A, B \rangle_\text{HS} = \operatorname{tr}(B^* A) = \sum_i \langle Ae_i, Be_i \rangle.$$

The Hilbert–Schmidt operators form a two-sided *-ideal in the Banach algebra of bounded operators on H. They also form a Hilbert space, denoted by B_{HS}(H) or B_{2}(H), which can be shown to be naturally isometrically isomorphic to the tensor product of Hilbert spaces

$$H^* \otimes H,$$

where H^{∗} is the dual space of H. The norm induced by this inner product is the Hilbert–Schmidt norm under which the space of Hilbert–Schmidt operators is complete (thus making it into a Hilbert space). The space of all bounded linear operators of finite rank (i.e. that have a finite-dimensional range) is a dense subset of the space of Hilbert–Schmidt operators (with the Hilbert–Schmidt norm).

The set of Hilbert–Schmidt operators is closed in the norm topology if, and only if, H is finite-dimensional.

== Properties ==
- Every Hilbert–Schmidt operator T : H → H is a compact operator.
- A bounded linear operator T : H → H is Hilbert–Schmidt if and only if the same is true of the operator $\left| T \right| := \sqrt{T^* T}$, in which case the Hilbert–Schmidt norms of $T$ and $\left| T \right|$ are equal.
- Hilbert–Schmidt operators are nuclear operators of order 2, and are therefore compact operators.
- If $S : H_1 \to H_2$ and $T : H_2 \to H_3$ are Hilbert–Schmidt operators between Hilbert spaces then the composition $T \circ S : H_1 \to H_3$ is a nuclear operator.
- If T : H → H is a bounded linear operator then we have $\left\| T \right\| \leq \left\| T \right\|_{\operatorname{HS}}$.
- T is a Hilbert–Schmidt operator if and only if the trace $\operatorname{tr}$ of the nonnegative self-adjoint operator $T^{*} T$ is finite, in which case $\|T\|^2_\text{HS} = \operatorname{tr}(T^* T)$.
- If T : H → H is a bounded linear operator on H and S : H → H is a Hilbert–Schmidt operator on H then $\left\| S^* \right\|_{\operatorname{HS}} = \left\| S \right\|_{\operatorname{HS}}$, $\left\| T S \right\|_{\operatorname{HS}} \leq \left\| T \right\| \left\| S \right\|_{\operatorname{HS}}$, and $\left\| S T \right\|_{\operatorname{HS}} \leq \left\| S \right\|_{\operatorname{HS}} \left\| T \right\|$. In particular, the composition of two Hilbert–Schmidt operators is again Hilbert–Schmidt (and even a trace class operator).
- The space of Hilbert–Schmidt operators on H is an ideal of the space of bounded operators $B\left( H \right)$ that contains the operators of finite-rank.
- If A is a Hilbert–Schmidt operator on H then
  $$\|A\|^2_\text{HS} = \sum_{i,j} |\langle e_i, Ae_j \rangle|^2 = \|A\|^2_2$$
  where $\{e_i: i \in I\}$ is an orthonormal basis of H, and $\|A\|_2$ is the Schatten norm of $A$ for p = 2. In Euclidean space, $\|\cdot\|_\text{HS}$ is also called the Frobenius norm.

== See also ==
- Frobenius inner product – Binary operation, takes two matrices and returns a scalar
- Sazonov's theorem
- Trace class – Compact operator for which a finite trace can be defined
