= Trace class =

Compact operator for which a finite trace can be defined

In mathematics, specifically functional analysis, a trace-class operator is a linear operator for which a trace may be defined, such that the trace is a finite number independent of the choice of basis used to compute the trace. This trace of trace-class operators generalizes the trace of matrices studied in linear algebra. All trace-class operators are compact operators.

In quantum mechanics, quantum states are described by density matrices, which are certain trace class operators.

Trace-class operators are essentially the same as nuclear operators, though many authors reserve the term "trace-class operator" for the special case of nuclear operators on Hilbert spaces and use the term "nuclear operator" in more general topological vector spaces (such as Banach spaces).

== Definition ==
Let $H$ be a separable Hilbert space, $\left\{e_k\right\}_{k=1}^{\infty}$ an orthonormal basis and $A : H \to H$ a positive bounded linear operator on $H$. The trace of $A$ is denoted by $\operatorname{Tr} (A)$ and defined as

$$\operatorname{Tr} (A) = \sum_{k=1}^{\infty} \left\langle A e_k, e_k \right\rangle,$$

independent of the choice of orthonormal basis. A (not necessarily positive) bounded linear operator $T:H\rightarrow H$ is called trace class if and only if

$$\operatorname{Tr}( |T|) < \infty,$$

where $|T| := \sqrt{T^* T}$ denotes the positive-semidefinite Hermitian square root.

The trace-norm of a trace class operator T is defined as
$$\|T\|_1 := \operatorname{Tr} (|T|).$$
One can show that the trace-norm is a norm on the space of all trace class operators $B_1(H)$ and that $B_1(H)$, with the trace-norm, becomes a Banach space.

When $H$ is finite-dimensional, every (positive) operator is trace class. For $A$ this definition coincides with that of the trace of a matrix. If $H$ is complex, then $A$ is always self-adjoint (i.e. $A=A^*=|A|$) though the converse is not necessarily true.

== Equivalent formulations ==
Given a bounded linear operator $T : H \to H$, each of the following statements is equivalent to $T$ being in the trace class:

- $\operatorname{Tr} (|T|) =\sum_k \left\langle |T| \, e_k, e_k \right\rangle$ is finite for every orthonormal basis $\left(e_k\right)_{k}$ of H.
- T is a nuclear operator.
  There exist two orthogonal sequences $\left(x_i\right)_{i=1}^{\infty}$ and $\left(y_i\right)_{i=1}^{\infty}$ in $H$ and positive real numbers $\left(\lambda_i\right)_{i=1}^{\infty}$ in $\ell^1$ such that $\sum_{i=1}^{\infty} \lambda_i < \infty$ and
  $$x \mapsto T(x) = \sum_{i=1}^{\infty} \lambda_i \left\langle x, x_i \right\rangle y_i, \quad \forall x \in H,$$
  where $\left(\lambda_i\right)_{i=1}^{\infty}$ are the singular values of T (or, equivalently, the eigenvalues of $|T|$), with each value repeated as often as its multiplicity.
- T is a compact operator with $\operatorname{Tr}(|T|)<\infty.$
  If T is trace class then
  $$\|T\|_1 = \sup \left\{ |\operatorname{Tr} (C T)| : \|C\| \leq 1 \text{ and } C : H \to H \text{ is a compact operator } \right\}.$$
- T is an integral operator.
- T is equal to the composition of two Hilbert-Schmidt operators.
- $\sqrt{|T|}$ is a Hilbert-Schmidt operator.

== Examples ==
=== Spectral theorem ===
Let $T$ be a bounded self-adjoint operator on a Hilbert space. Then $T^2$ is trace class if and only if $T$ has a pure point spectrum with eigenvalues $\left\{\lambda_i(T)\right\}_{i=1}^{\infty}$ such that

$$\operatorname{Tr}(T^2) = \sum_{i=1}^{\infty}\lambda_i(T^2) < \infty.$$

=== Mercer's theorem ===
Mercer's theorem provides another example of a trace class operator. That is, suppose $K$ is a continuous symmetric positive-definite kernel on $L^2([a,b])$, defined as

$$K(s,t) = \sum_{j=1}^\infty \lambda_j \, e_j(s) \, e_j(t)$$

then the associated Hilbert–Schmidt integral operator $T_K$ is trace class, i.e.,

$$\operatorname{Tr}(T_K) = \int_a^b K(t,t)\,dt = \sum_i \lambda_i.$$

=== Finite-rank operators ===
Every finite-rank operator is a trace-class operator. Furthermore, the space of all finite-rank operators is a dense subspace of $B_1(H)$ (when endowed with the trace norm).

Given any $x, y \in H,$ define the operator $x \otimes y : H \to H$ by $(x \otimes y)(z) := \langle z, y \rangle x.$ Then $x \otimes y$ is a continuous linear operator of rank 1 and is thus trace class; moreover, for any bounded linear operator A on H (and into H), $\operatorname{Tr}(A(x \otimes y)) = \langle A x, y \rangle.$

== Properties ==
1. If $A : H \to H$ is a non-negative self-adjoint operator, then $A$ is trace-class if and only if $\operatorname{Tr} A < \infty.$ Therefore, a self-adjoint operator $A$ is trace-class if and only if its positive part $A^{+}$ and negative part $A^{-}$ are both trace-class. (The positive and negative parts of a self-adjoint operator are obtained by the continuous functional calculus.)
2. The trace is a linear functional over the space of trace-class operators, that is,
  $$\operatorname{Tr}(aA + bB) = a \operatorname{Tr}(A) + b \operatorname{Tr}(B).$$
  The bilinear map
  $$\langle A, B \rangle = \operatorname{Tr}(A^* B)$$
  is an inner product on the trace class; the corresponding norm is called the Hilbert–Schmidt norm. The completion of the trace-class operators in the Hilbert–Schmidt norm are called the Hilbert–Schmidt operators.
3. $\operatorname{Tr} : B_1(H) \to \Complex$ is a positive linear functional such that if $T$ is a trace class operator satisfying $T \geq 0 \text{ and }\operatorname{Tr} T = 0,$ then $T = 0.$
4. If $T : H \to H$ is trace-class then so is $T^*$ and $\|T\|_1 = \left\|T^*\right\|_1.$
5. If $A : H \to H$ is bounded, and $T : H \to H$ is trace-class, then $AT$ and $TA$ are also trace-class (i.e. the space of trace-class operators on H is a two-sided ideal in the algebra of bounded linear operators on H), and
  $$\|A T\|_1 = \operatorname{Tr}(|A T|) \leq \|A\| \|T\|_1, \quad \|T A\|_1 = \operatorname{Tr}(|T A|) \leq \|A\| \|T\|_1.$$
  Furthermore, under the same hypothesis,
  $$\operatorname{Tr}(A T) = \operatorname{Tr}(T A)$$
  and $|\operatorname{Tr}(A T)| \leq \|A\| \|T\|.$ The last assertion also holds under the weaker hypothesis that A and T are Hilbert–Schmidt.
6. If $\left(e_k\right)_{k}$ and $\left(f_k\right)_{k}$ are two orthonormal bases of H and if T is trace class then $\sum_{k} \left| \left\langle T e_k, f_k \right\rangle \right| \leq \|T\|_{1}.$
7. If A is trace-class, then one can define the Fredholm determinant of $I + A$:
  $$\det(I + A) := \prod_{n \geq 1}[1 + \lambda_n(A)],$$
  where $\{\lambda_n(A)\}_n$ is the spectrum of $A.$ The trace class condition on $A$ guarantees that the infinite product is finite: indeed,
  $$\det(I + A) \leq e^{\|A\|_1}.$$
  It also implies that $\det(I + A) \neq 0$ if and only if $(I + A)$ is invertible.
8. If $A : H \to H$ is trace class then for any orthonormal basis $\left(e_k\right)_{k}$ of $H,$ the sum of positive terms $\sum_k \left| \left\langle A \, e_k, e_k \right\rangle \right|$ is finite.
9. If $A = B^* C$ for some Hilbert-Schmidt operators $B$ and $C$ then for any normal vector $e \in H,$ $|\langle A e, e \rangle| \le \frac{1}{2} \left(\|B e\|^2 + \|C e\|^2\right)$ holds.

=== Lidskii's theorem ===
Let $A$ be a trace-class operator in a separable Hilbert space $H,$ and let $\{\lambda_n(A)\}_{n=1}^{N\leq \infty}$ be the eigenvalues of $A.$ Let us assume that $\lambda_n(A)$ are enumerated with algebraic multiplicities taken into account (that is, if the algebraic multiplicity of $\lambda$ is $k,$ then $\lambda$ is repeated $k$ times in the list $\lambda_1(A), \lambda_2(A), \dots$). Lidskii's theorem (named after Victor Borisovich Lidskii) states that
$$\operatorname{Tr}(A)=\sum_{n=1}^N \lambda_n(A)$$

Note that the series on the right converges absolutely due to Weyl's inequality
$$\sum_{n=1}^N \left|\lambda_n(A)\right| \leq \sum_{m=1}^M s_m(A)$$
between the eigenvalues $\{\lambda_n(A)\}_{n=1}^N$ and the singular values $\{s_m(A)\}_{m=1}^M$ of the compact operator $A.$ See also Grothendieck trace theorem.

=== Relationship between common classes of operators ===
One can view certain classes of bounded operators as noncommutative analogue of classical sequence spaces, with trace-class operators as the noncommutative analogue of the sequence space $\ell^1(\N).$

Indeed, it is possible to apply the spectral theorem to show that every normal trace-class operator on a separable Hilbert space can be realized in a certain way as an $\ell^1$ sequence with respect to some choice of a pair of Hilbert bases. In the same vein, the bounded operators are noncommutative versions of $\ell^{\infty}(\N),$ the compact operators that of $c_0$ (the sequences convergent to 0), Hilbert–Schmidt operators correspond to $\ell^2(\N),$ and finite-rank operators to $c_{00}$ (the sequences that have only finitely many non-zero terms). To some extent, the relationships between these classes of operators are similar to the relationships between their commutative counterparts.

Recall that every compact operator $T$ on a Hilbert space takes the following canonical form: there exist orthonormal bases $(u_i)_i$ and $(v_i)_i$ and a sequence $\left(\alpha_i\right)_{i}$ of non-negative numbers with $\alpha_i \to 0$ such that
$$T x = \sum_i \alpha_i \langle x, v_i\rangle u_i \quad \text{ for all } x\in H.$$
Making the above heuristic comments more precise, we have that $T$ is trace-class iff the series $\sum_i \alpha_i$ is convergent, $T$ is Hilbert–Schmidt iff $\sum_i \alpha_i^2$ is convergent, and $T$ is finite-rank iff the sequence $\left(\alpha_i\right)_{i}$ has only finitely many nonzero terms. This allows to relate these classes of operators. The following inclusions hold and are all proper when $H$ is infinite-dimensional:
$$\{ \text{ finite rank } \} \subseteq \{ \text{ trace class } \} \subseteq \{ \text{ Hilbert--Schmidt } \} \subseteq \{ \text{ compact } \}.$$

The trace-class operators are given the trace norm $\|T\|_1 = \operatorname{Tr} \left[\left(T^* T\right)^{1/2}\right] = \sum_i \alpha_i.$ The norm corresponding to the Hilbert–Schmidt inner product is
$$\|T\|_2 = \left[\operatorname{Tr} \left(T^* T\right)\right]^{1/2} = \left(\sum_i \alpha_i^2\right)^{1/2}.$$
Also, the usual operator norm is $\| T \| = \sup_{i} \left(\alpha_i\right).$ By classical inequalities regarding sequences,
$$\|T\| \leq \|T\|_2 \leq \|T\|_1$$
for appropriate $T.$

It is also clear that finite-rank operators are dense in both trace-class and Hilbert–Schmidt in their respective norms.

=== Trace class as the dual of compact operators ===
The dual space of $c_0$ is $\ell^1(\N).$ Similarly, we have that the dual of compact operators, denoted by $K(H)^*,$ is the trace-class operators, denoted by $B_1.$ The argument, which we now sketch, is reminiscent of that for the corresponding sequence spaces. Let $f \in K(H)^*,$ we identify $f$ with the operator $T_f$ defined by
$$\langle T_f x, y \rangle = f\left(S_{x,y}\right),$$
where $S_{x,y}$ is the rank-one operator given by
$$S_{x,y}(h) = \langle h, y \rangle x.$$

This identification works because the finite-rank operators are norm-dense in $K(H).$ In the event that $T_f$ is a positive operator, for any orthonormal basis $u_i,$ one has
$$\sum_i \langle T_f u_i, u_i \rangle = f(I) \leq \|f\|,$$
where $I$ is the identity operator:
$$I = \sum_i \langle \cdot, u_i \rangle u_i.$$

But this means that $T_f$ is trace-class. An appeal to polar decomposition extend this to the general case, where $T_f$ need not be positive.

A limiting argument using finite-rank operators shows that $\|T_f\|_1 = \|f\|.$ Thus $K(H)^*$ is isometrically isomorphic to $B_1.$

=== As the predual of bounded operators ===
Recall that the dual of $\ell^1(\N)$ is $\ell^{\infty}(\N).$ In the present context, the dual of trace-class operators $B_1$ is the bounded operators $B(H).$ More precisely, the set $B_1$ is a two-sided ideal in $B(H).$ So given any operator $T \in B(H),$ we may define a continuous linear functional $\varphi_T$ on $B_1$ by $\varphi_T(A) = \operatorname{Tr} (AT).$ This correspondence between bounded linear operators and elements $\varphi_T$ of the dual space of $B_1$ is an isometric isomorphism. It follows that $B(H)$ is the dual space of $B_1.$ This can be used to define the weak-* topology on $B(H).$

== See also ==
- Nuclear operators between Banach spaces

== Bibliography ==
- Conway, John B. (2000). A Course in Operator Theory. Providence (R.I.): American Mathematical Soc. ISBN 978-0-8218-2065-0.
- Conway, John B. (1990). A course in functional analysis. New York: Springer-Verlag. ISBN 978-0-387-97245-9. OCLC 21195908.
- Dixmier, J. (1969). Les Algebres d'Operateurs dans l'Espace Hilbertien. Gauthier-Villars.
- Mittelstaedt, Peter (2009). "Mixed State". Compendium of Quantum Physics. Berlin, Heidelberg: Springer Berlin Heidelberg. pp. 389–390. doi:10.1007/978-3-540-70626-7_120. ISBN 978-3-540-70622-9.
- Reed, M.; Simon, B. (1980). Methods of Modern Mathematical Physics: Vol 1: Functional analysis. Academic Press. ISBN 978-0-12-585050-6.
- Schaefer, Helmut H. (1999). Topological Vector Spaces. GTM. Vol. 3. New York, NY: Springer New York Imprint Springer. ISBN 978-1-4612-7155-0. OCLC 840278135.
- Simon, Barry (2010). Szegő's theorem and its descendants: spectral theory for L² perturbations of orthogonal polynomials. Princeton University Press. ISBN 978-0-691-14704-8.
- Trèves, François (2006) [1967]. Topological Vector Spaces, Distributions and Kernels. Mineola, N.Y.: Dover Publications. ISBN 978-0-486-45352-1. OCLC 853623322.
