= Tensor product of Hilbert spaces =

Tensor product space endowed with a special inner product

In mathematics, and in particular functional analysis, the tensor product of Hilbert spaces is a way to extend the tensor product construction so that the result of taking a tensor product of two Hilbert spaces is another Hilbert space. Roughly speaking, the tensor product is the metric space completion of the ordinary tensor product. This is an example of a topological tensor product. The tensor product allows Hilbert spaces to be collected into a symmetric monoidal category.

== Definition ==
Since Hilbert spaces have inner products, one would like to introduce an inner product, and thereby a topology, on the tensor product that arises naturally from the inner products on the factors. Let $H_1$ and $H_2$ be two Hilbert spaces with inner products $\langle\cdot, \cdot\rangle_1$ and $\langle\cdot, \cdot\rangle_2,$ respectively. Construct the tensor product of $H_1$ and $H_2$ as vector spaces as explained in the article on tensor products. We can turn this vector space tensor product into an inner product space by defining

$$\left\langle\phi_1 \otimes \phi_2, \psi_1 \otimes \psi_2\right\rangle = \left\langle\phi_1, \psi_1\right\rangle_1 \, \left\langle\phi_2, \psi_2\right\rangle_2$$

for all $\phi_1,\psi_1 \in H_1$ $\phi_2,\psi_2 \in H_2$ and extending by linearity. That this inner product is the natural one is justified by the identification of scalar-valued bilinear maps on $H_1 \times H_2$ and linear functionals on their vector space tensor product. Finally, take the completion under this inner product. The resulting Hilbert space is the tensor product of $H_1$ and $H_2.$

=== Explicit construction ===
The tensor product can also be defined without appealing to the metric space completion. If $H_1$ and $H_2$ are two Hilbert spaces, one associates to every simple tensor product $x_1 \otimes x_2$ the rank one operator from $H_1^*$ to $H_2$ that maps a given $x^*\in H^*_1$ as
$$x^* \mapsto x^*(x_1) \, x_2.$$

This extends to a linear identification between $H_1 \otimes H_2$ and the space of finite rank operators from $H_1^*$ to $H_2.$ The finite rank operators are embedded in the Hilbert space $HS(H_1^*, H_2)$ of Hilbert–Schmidt operators from $H_1^*$ to $H_2.$ The scalar product in $HS(H_1^*, H_2)$ is given by
$$\langle T_1, T_2 \rangle = \sum_n \left \langle T_1 e_n^*, T_2 e_n^* \right \rangle,$$
where $\left(e_n^*\right)$ is an arbitrary orthonormal basis of $H_1^*.$

Under the preceding identification, one can define the Hilbertian tensor product of $H_1$ and $H_2,$ that is isometrically and linearly isomorphic to $HS(H_1^*, H_2).$

=== Universal property ===
The Hilbert tensor product $H_1 \otimes H_2$ is characterized by the following universal property (Kadison & Ringrose 1997, Theorem 2.6.4):

Theorem— There is a weakly Hilbert–Schmidt mapping $p : H_1 \times H_2 \to H_1 \otimes H_2$ such that, given any weakly Hilbert–Schmidt mapping $L : H_1 \times H_2 \to K$ to a Hilbert space $K,$ there is a unique bounded operator $T : H_1 \otimes H_2 \to K$ such that $L = T p.$

A weakly Hilbert-Schmidt mapping $L : H_1 \times H_2 \to K$ is defined as a bilinear map for which a real number $d$ exists, such that

$$\sum_{i,j=1}^\infty \big|\langle L(e_i, f_j), u\rangle\big|^2 \leq d^2\|u\|^2$$

for all $u \in K$ and one (hence all) orthonormal bases $e_1, e_2, \ldots$ of $H_1$ and $f_1, f_2, \ldots$ of $H_2$.

As with any universal property, this characterizes the tensor product $H$ uniquely, up to isomorphism. The same universal property, with obvious modifications, also applies for the tensor product of any finite number of Hilbert spaces. It is essentially the same universal property shared by all definitions of tensor products, irrespective of the spaces being tensored: this implies that any space with a tensor product is a symmetric monoidal category, and Hilbert spaces are a particular example thereof.

=== Infinite tensor products ===
Two different definitions have historically been proposed for the tensor product of an arbitrary-sized collection $\{H_n\}_{n\in N}$ of Hilbert spaces.

Von Neumann's traditional definition simply takes the "obvious" tensor product: to compute $\bigotimes_n{H_n}$, first collect all simple tensors of the form $\bigotimes_{n\in N}{e_n}$ such that $\prod_{n\in N}{\|e_n\|}<\infty$. The latter describes a pre-inner product through the polarization identity, so take the closed span of such simple tensors modulo that inner product's isotropy subspaces. This definition is almost never separable, in part because, in physical applications, "most" of the space describes impossible states. Modern authors typically use instead a definition due to Guichardet: to compute $\bigotimes_n{H_n}$, first select a unit vector $v_n\in H_n$ in each Hilbert space, and then collect all simple tensors of the form $\bigotimes_{n\in N}{e_n}$, in which only finitely-many $e_n$ are not $v_n$. Then take the $L^2$ completion of these simple tensors.

=== Operator algebras ===
Let $\mathfrak{A}_i$ be the von Neumann algebra of bounded operators on $H_i$ for $i=1,2.$ Then the von Neumann tensor product of the von Neumann algebras is the strong completion of the set of all finite linear combinations of simple tensor products $A_1\otimes A_2$ where $A_i \in \mathfrak{A}_i$ for $i = 1, 2.$ This is exactly equal to the von Neumann algebra of bounded operators of $H_1\otimes H_2.$ Unlike for Hilbert spaces, one may take infinite tensor products of von Neumann algebras, and for that matter C*-algebras of operators, without defining reference states. This is one advantage of the "algebraic" method in quantum statistical mechanics.

== Properties ==
If $H_1$ and $H_2$ have orthonormal bases $\left\{\phi_k\right\}$ and $\left\{\psi_l\right\},$ respectively, then $\left\{\phi_k \otimes \psi_l\right\}$ is an orthonormal basis for $H_1\otimes H_2.$ In particular, the Hilbert dimension of the tensor product is the product (as cardinal numbers) of the Hilbert dimensions.

== Examples and applications ==
The following examples show how tensor products arise naturally.

Given two measure spaces $X$ and $Y$, with measures $\mu$ and $\nu$ respectively, one may look at $L^2(X \times Y),$ the space of functions on $X \times Y$ that are square integrable with respect to the product measure $\mu\times\nu.$ If $f$ is a square integrable function on $X,$ and $g$ is a square integrable function on $Y,$ then we can define a function $h$ on $X\times Y$ by $h(x, y) = f(x) g(y).$ The definition of the product measure ensures that all functions of this form are square integrable, so this defines a bilinear mapping $L^2(X) \times L^2(Y) \to L^2(X\times Y).$ Linear combinations of functions of the form $f(x) g(y)$ are also in $L^2(X \times Y).$ It turns out that the set of linear combinations is in fact dense in $L^2(X \times Y),$ if $L^2(X)$ and $L^2(Y)$ are separable. This shows that $L^2(X) \otimes L^2(Y)$ is isomorphic to $L^2(X \times Y),$ and it also explains why we need to take the completion in the construction of the Hilbert space tensor product.

Similarly, we can show that $L^2(X;H)$, denoting the space of square integrable functions $X \to H,$ is isomorphic to $L^2(X) \otimes H$ if this space is separable. The isomorphism maps $f(x) \otimes \phi \in L^2(X)\otimes H$ to $f(x) \phi \in L^2(X;H).$ We can combine this with the previous example and conclude that $L^2(X) \otimes L^2(Y)$ and $L^2(X \times Y)$ are both isomorphic to $L^2\left(X; L^2(Y)\right).$

Tensor products of Hilbert spaces arise often in quantum mechanics. If some particle is described by the Hilbert space $H_1,$ and another particle is described by $H_2,$ then the system consisting of both particles is described by the tensor product of $H_1$ and $H_2.$ For example, the state space of a quantum harmonic oscillator is $L^2(\R),$ so the state space of two oscillators is $L^2(\R) \otimes L^2(\R),$ which is isomorphic to $L^2\left(\R^2\right).$ Therefore, the two-particle system is described by wave functions of the form $\psi\left(x_1, x_2\right).$ A more intricate example is provided by the Fock spaces, which describe a variable number of particles.
