= Projective tensor product =

In functional analysis, an area of mathematics, the projective tensor product of two locally convex topological vector spaces is a natural topological vector space structure on their tensor product. Namely, given locally convex topological vector spaces $X$ and $Y$, the projective topology, or π-topology, on $X \otimes Y$ is the strongest topology which makes $X \otimes Y$ a locally convex topological vector space such that the canonical map $(x,y) \mapsto x \otimes y$ (from $X\times Y$ to $X \otimes Y$) is continuous. When equipped with this topology, $X \otimes Y$ is denoted $X \otimes_\pi Y$ and called the projective tensor product of $X$ and $Y$. It is a particular instance of a topological tensor product.

== Definitions ==
Let $X$ and $Y$ be locally convex topological vector spaces. Their projective tensor product $X \otimes_\pi Y$ is the unique locally convex topological vector space with underlying vector space $X \otimes Y$ having the following universal property:

For any locally convex topological vector space $Z$, if $\Phi_Z$ is the canonical map from the vector space of bilinear maps $X\times Y \to Z$ to the vector space of linear maps $X \otimes Y \to Z$, then the image of the restriction of $\Phi_Z$ to the continuous bilinear maps is the space of continuous linear maps $X \otimes_\pi Y \to Z$.

When the topologies of $X$ and $Y$ are induced by seminorms, the topology of $X \otimes_\pi Y$ is induced by seminorms constructed from those on $X$ and $Y$ as follows. If $p$ is a seminorm on $X$, and $q$ is a seminorm on $Y$, define their tensor product $p \otimes q$ to be the seminorm on $X \otimes Y$ given by
$$(p \otimes q)(b) = \inf_{r > 0,\, b \in r W} r$$
for all $b$ in $X \otimes Y$, where $W$ is the balanced convex hull of the set $\left\{ x \otimes y : p(x) \leq 1, q(y) \leq 1 \right\}$. The projective topology on $X \otimes Y$ is generated by the collection of such tensor products of the seminorms on $X$ and $Y$. When $X$ and $Y$ are normed spaces, this definition applied to the norms on $X$ and $Y$ gives a norm, called the projective norm, on $X \otimes Y$ which generates the projective topology.

== Properties ==
Throughout, all spaces are assumed to be locally convex. The symbol $X \widehat{\otimes}_\pi Y$ denotes the completion of the projective tensor product of $X$ and $Y$.

- If $X$ and $Y$ are both Hausdorff then so is $X \otimes_\pi Y$; if $X$ and $Y$ are Fréchet spaces then $X \otimes_\pi Y$ is barelled.
- For any two continuous linear operators $u_1 : X_1 \to Y_1$ and $u_2 : X_2 \to Y_2$, their tensor product (as linear maps) $u_1 \otimes u_2 : X_1 \otimes_\pi X_2 \to Y_1 \otimes_\pi Y_2$ is continuous.
- In general, the projective tensor product does not respect subspaces (e.g. if $Z$ is a vector subspace of $X$ then the TVS $Z \otimes_\pi Y$ has in general a coarser topology than the subspace topology inherited from $X \otimes_\pi Y$).
- If $E$ and $F$ are complemented subspaces of $X$ and $Y,$ respectively, then $E \otimes F$ is a complemented vector subspace of $X \otimes_\pi Y$ and the projective norm on $E \otimes_\pi F$ is equivalent to the projective norm on $X \otimes_\pi Y$ restricted to the subspace $E \otimes F$. Furthermore, if $X$ and $F$ are complemented by projections of norm 1, then $E \otimes F$ is complemented by a projection of norm 1.
- Let $E$ and $F$ be vector subspaces of the Banach spaces $X$ and $Y$, respectively. Then $E \widehat{\otimes} F$ is a TVS-subspace of $X \widehat{\otimes}_\pi Y$ if and only if every bounded bilinear form on $E \times F$ extends to a continuous bilinear form on $X \times Y$ with the same norm.

== Completion ==
In general, the space $X \otimes_\pi Y$ is not complete, even if both $X$ and $Y$ are complete (in fact, if $X$ and $Y$ are both infinite-dimensional Banach spaces then $X \otimes_\pi Y$ is necessarily not complete). However, $X \otimes_\pi Y$ can always be linearly embedded as a dense vector subspace of some complete locally convex TVS, which is generally denoted by $X \widehat{\otimes}_\pi Y$.

The continuous dual space of $X \widehat{\otimes}_\pi Y$ is the same as that of $X \otimes_\pi Y$, namely, the space of continuous bilinear forms $B(X, Y)$.

=== Grothendieck's representation of elements in the completion ===
In a Hausdorff locally convex space $X,$ a sequence $\left(x_i\right)_{i=1}^{\infty}$ in $X$ is absolutely convergent if $\sum_{i=1}^{\infty} p \left(x_i\right) < \infty$ for every continuous seminorm $p$ on $X.$ We write $x = \sum_{i=1}^{\infty} x_i$ if the sequence of partial sums $\left(\sum_{i=1}^n x_i\right)_{n=1}^{\infty}$ converges to $x$ in $X.$

The following fundamental result in the theory of topological tensor products is due to Alexander Grothendieck.

Theorem—Let $X$ and $Y$ be metrizable locally convex TVSs and let $z \in X \widehat{\otimes}_\pi Y.$ Then $z$ is the sum of an absolutely convergent series
$$z = \sum_{i=1}^{\infty} \lambda_i x_i \otimes y_i$$
where $\sum_{i=1}^{\infty}|\lambda_i|< \infty,$ and $\left(x_i\right)_{i=1}^{\infty}$ and $\left(y_i\right)_{i=1}^{\infty}$ are null sequences in $X$ and $Y,$ respectively.

The next theorem shows that it is possible to make the representation of $z$ independent of the sequences $\left(x_i\right)_{i=1}^{\infty}$ and $\left(y_i\right)_{i=1}^{\infty}.$

Theorem—Let $X$ and $Y$ be Fréchet spaces and let $U$ (resp. $V$) be a balanced open neighborhood of the origin in $X$ (resp. in $Y$). Let $K_0$ be a compact subset of the convex balanced hull of $U \otimes V := \{ u \otimes v : u \in U, v \in V \}.$ There exists a compact subset $K_1$ of the unit ball in $\ell^1$ and sequences $\left(x_i\right)_{i=1}^{\infty}$ and $\left(y_i\right)_{i=1}^{\infty}$ contained in $U$ and $V,$ respectively, converging to the origin such that for every $z \in K_0$ there exists some $\left(\lambda_i\right)_{i=1}^{\infty} \in K_1$ such that
$$z = \sum_{i=1}^{\infty} \lambda_i x_i \otimes y_i.$$

=== Topology of bi-bounded convergence ===
Let $\mathfrak{B}_X$ and $\mathfrak{B}_Y$ denote the families of all bounded subsets of $X$ and $Y,$ respectively. Since the continuous dual space of $X \widehat{\otimes}_\pi Y$ is the space of continuous bilinear forms $B(X, Y),$ we can place on $B(X, Y)$ the topology of uniform convergence on sets in $\mathfrak{B}_X \times \mathfrak{B}_Y,$ which is also called the topology of bi-bounded convergence. This topology is coarser than the strong topology on $B(X, Y)$, and in (Grothendieck 1955), Alexander Grothendieck was interested in when these two topologies were identical. This is equivalent to the problem: Given a bounded subset $B \subseteq X \widehat{\otimes} Y,$ do there exist bounded subsets $B_1 \subseteq X$ and $B_2 \subseteq Y$ such that $B$ is a subset of the closed convex hull of $B_1 \otimes B_2 := \{ b_1 \otimes b_2 : b_1 \in B_1, b_2 \in B_2 \}$?

Grothendieck proved that these topologies are equal when $X$ and $Y$ are both Banach spaces or both are DF-spaces (a class of spaces introduced by Grothendieck). They are also equal when both spaces are Fréchet with one of them being nuclear.

=== Strong dual and bidual ===
Let $X$ be a locally convex topological vector space and let $X^{\prime}$ be its continuous dual space. Alexander Grothendieck characterized the strong dual and bidual for certain situations:

Theorem (Grothendieck)—Let $N$ and $Y$ be locally convex topological vector spaces with $N$ nuclear. Assume that both $N$ and $Y$ are Fréchet spaces, or else that they are both DF-spaces. Then, denoting strong dual spaces with a subscripted $b$:

1. The strong dual of $N \widehat{\otimes}_\pi Y$ can be identified with $N^{\prime}_b \widehat{\otimes}_\pi Y^{\prime}_b$;
2. The bidual of $N \widehat{\otimes}_\pi Y$ can be identified with $N \widehat{\otimes}_\pi Y^{\prime\prime}$;
3. If $Y$ is reflexive then $N \widehat{\otimes}_\pi Y$ (and hence $N^{\prime}_b \widehat{\otimes}_\pi Y^{\prime}_b$) is a reflexive space;
4. Every separately continuous bilinear form on $N^{\prime}_b \times Y^{\prime}_b$ is continuous;
5. Let $L\left(X^{\prime}_b, Y\right)$ be the space of bounded linear maps from $X^{\prime}_b$ to $Y$. Then, its strong dual can be identified with $N^{\prime}_b \widehat{\otimes}_\pi Y^{\prime}_b,$ so in particular if $Y$ is reflexive then so is $L_b\left(X^{\prime}_b, Y\right).$

== Examples ==
- For $(X, \mathcal{A}, \mu)$ a measure space, let $L^1$ be the real Lebesgue space $L^1(\mu)$; let $E$ be a real Banach space. Let $L^1_E$ be the completion of the space of simple functions $X\to E$, modulo the subspace of functions $X\to E$ whose pointwise norms, considered as functions $X\to\Reals$, have integral $0$ with respect to $\mu$. Then $L^1_E$ is isometrically isomorphic to $L^1 \widehat{\otimes}_\pi E$.

== See also ==
- Inductive tensor product
- Injective tensor product
- Tensor product of Hilbert spaces – Tensor product space endowed with a special inner product
