= Lecture Notes in Mathematics =

Book series by Springer

- Discipline: Mathematics
- Language: English

Publication details
- History: 1964–present
- Publisher: Springer Science+Business Media

Standard abbreviations
- ISO 4: Lect. Notes Math.
- MathSciNet: Lecture Notes in Math.

Indexing
- ISSN: 0075-8434

Links
- Series homepage

Lecture Notes in Mathematics is a book series in the field of mathematics, including articles related to both research and teaching. It was established in 1964 and was edited by A. Dold, Heidelberg and B. Eckmann, Zürich. Its publisher is Springer Science+Business Media (formerly Springer-Verlag).

The intent of the series is to publish not only lecture notes, but results from seminars and conferences, more quickly than the several-years-long process of publishing polished journal papers in mathematics. In order to speed the publication process, early volumes of the series (before electronic publishing) were reproduced photographically from typewritten manuscripts. According to Earl Taft, it has been "enormously successful" and "is considered a very valuable service to the mathematical community".

As of 2025, there have been over 2380 volumes in the series.

== See also ==
- Lecture Notes in Physics
- Lecture Notes in Computer Science
