= List of things named after Issai Schur =

This is a list of things named after Issai Schur.

- Frobenius–Schur indicator
- Herz–Schur multiplier
- Jordan–Schur theorem
- Lehmer–Schur algorithm
- Schur algebra
- Schur class
- Schur's conjecture
- Schur complement method
- Schur complement
- Schur-convex function
- Schur decomposition
- Schur functor
- Schur index
- Schur's inequality
- Schur's lemma (from Riemannian geometry)
- Schur's lemma
- Schur module
- Schur multiplier
  - Schur cover
- Schur orthogonality relations
- Schur polynomial
- Schur product
- Schur product theorem
- Schur test
- Schur's property
- Schur's theorem
  - Schur's number
- Schur–Horn theorem
- Schur–Weyl duality
- Schur–Zassenhaus theorem
