= Schur's lemma (disambiguation) =

At least three well-known results in mathematics bear the name Schur's lemma:

- Schur's lemma from representation theory
- Schur's lemma from Riemannian geometry
- Schur's lemma in linear algebra says that every square complex matrix is unitarily triangularizable, see Schur decomposition
- Schur test for boundedness of integral operators

== See also ==
- Schur's theorem
- Schur's property
- Schur complement
