= Karamata's inequality =

Algebra theorem about convex functions

In mathematics, Karamata's inequality, named after Jovan Karamata, also known as the majorization inequality, is a theorem in elementary algebra for convex and concave real-valued functions, defined on an interval of the real line. It generalizes the discrete form of Jensen's inequality, and generalizes in turn to the concept of Schur-convex functions.

== Statement of the inequality ==
Let I be an interval of the real line and let f denote a real-valued, convex function defined on I. If x_{1}, …, x_{n} and y_{1}, …, y_{n} are numbers in I such that (x_{1}, …, x_{n}) majorizes (y_{1}, …, y_{n}), then

$f(x_1)+\cdots+f(x_n) \ge f(y_1)+\cdots+f(y_n).$	1

Here majorization means that x_{1}, …, x_{n} and y_{1}, …, y_{n} satisfies

$x_1\ge x_2\ge\cdots\ge x_n$ and $y_1\ge y_2\ge\cdots\ge y_n,$	2

and we have the inequalities

$x_1+\cdots+x_i\ge y_1+\cdots+y_i$ for all i ∈ {1, …, n − 1}.	3

and the equality

$x_1+\cdots+x_n=y_1+\cdots+y_n$	4

If f is a strictly convex function, then the inequality (1) holds with equality if and only if y is a permutation of x.

=== Weak majorization case ===
$x \preceq_w y$ if and only if $\sum g\left(x_i\right) \leq \sum g\left(y_i\right)$ for any continuous increasing convex function $g: \R \to \R$.

== Remarks ==
- If the convex function f is non-decreasing, then the proof of (1) below and the discussion of equality in case of strict convexity shows that the equality (4) can be relaxed to
  $x_1+\cdots+x_n\ge y_1+\cdots+y_n.$	5
- The inequality (1) is reversed if f is concave, since in this case the function −f is convex.

== Example ==
The finite form of Jensen's inequality is a special case of this result. Consider the real numbers x_{1}, …, x_{n} ∈ I and let

$$a := \frac{x_1+x_2+\cdots+x_n}{n}$$

denote their arithmetic mean. Then (x_{1}, …, x_{n}) majorizes the n-tuple (a, a, …, a), since the arithmetic mean of the i largest numbers of (x_{1}, …, x_{n}) is at least as large as the arithmetic mean a of all the n numbers, for every i ∈ {1, …, n − 1}. By Karamata's inequality (1) for the convex function f,

$$f(x_1)+f(x_2)+ \cdots +f(x_n) \ge f(a)+f(a)+\cdots+f(a) = nf(a).$$

Dividing by n gives Jensen's inequality. The sign is reversed if f is concave.

== Proof of the inequality ==
We may assume that the numbers are in decreasing order as specified in (2).

If x_{i} = y_{i} for all i ∈ {1, …, n}, then the inequality (1) holds with equality, hence we may assume in the following that x_{i} ≠ y_{i} for at least one i.

If x_{i} = y_{i} for an i ∈ {1, …, n}, then the inequality (1) and the majorization properties (3) and (4) are not affected if we remove x_{i} and y_{i}. Hence we may assume that x_{i} ≠ y_{i} for all i ∈ {1, …, n}.

It is a property of convex functions that for two numbers x ≠ y in the interval I the slope

$$\frac{f(x)-f(y)}{x-y}$$

of the secant line through the points (x, f (x)) and (y, f (y)) of the graph of f is a monotonically non-decreasing function in x for y fixed (and vice versa). This implies that

$c_{i+1}:=\frac{f(x_{i+1})-f(y_{i+1})}{x_{i+1}-y_{i+1}}\le\frac{f(x_i)-f(y_i)}{x_i-y_i}=:c_i$	6

for all i ∈ {1, …, n − 1}. Define A_{0} = B_{0} = 0 and

$$A_i=x_1+\cdots+x_i,\qquad B_i=y_1+\cdots+y_i$$

for all i ∈ {1, …, n}. By the majorization property (3), A_{i} ≥ B_{i} for all i ∈ {1, …, n − 1} and by (4), A_{n} = B_{n}. Hence,

$$\begin{align} \sum_{i=1}^n \bigl(f(x_i) - f(y_i)\bigr) &=\sum_{i=1}^n c_i (x_i - y_i)\\ &=\sum_{i=1}^n c_i \bigl(\underbrace{A_i - A_{i-1}}_{=\,x_i}{} - (\underbrace{B_i - B_{i-1}}_{=\,y_i})\bigr)\\ &=\sum_{i=1}^n c_i (A_i - B_i) - \sum_{i=1}^n c_i (A_{i-1} - B_{i-1})\\ &=c_n (\underbrace{A_n-B_n}_{=\,0}) + \sum_{i=1}^{n-1}(\underbrace{c_i - c_{i + 1}}_{\ge\,0})(\underbrace{A_i - B_i}_{\ge\,0}) - c_1(\underbrace{A_0-B_0}_{=\,0})\\ &\ge0, \end{align}$$	7

which proves Karamata's inequality (1).

To discuss the case of equality in (1), note that x_{1} > y_{1} by (3) and our assumption x_{i} ≠ y_{i} for all i ∈ {1, …, n − 1}. Let i be the smallest index such that (x_{i}, y_{i}) ≠ (x_{i+1}, y_{i+1}), which exists due to (4). Then A_{i} > B_{i}. If f is strictly convex, then there is strict inequality in (6), meaning that c_{i+1} < c_{i}. Hence there is a strictly positive term in the sum on the right hand side of (7) and equality in (1) cannot hold.

If the convex function f is non-decreasing, then c_{n} ≥ 0. The relaxed condition (5) means that A_{n} ≥ B_{n}, which is enough to conclude that c_{n}(A_{n}−B_{n}) ≥ 0 in the last step of (7).

If the function f is strictly convex and non-decreasing, then c_{n} > 0. It only remains to discuss the case A_{n} > B_{n}. However, then there is a strictly positive term on the right hand side of (7) and equality in (1) cannot hold.
