= Symplectic matrix =

Mathematical concept

In mathematics, a symplectic matrix is a $2n\times 2n$ matrix $M$ with real entries that satisfies the condition

$$M^\text{T} \Omega M = \Omega,$$	1

where $M^\text{T}$ denotes the transpose of $M$ and $\Omega$ is a fixed $2n\times 2n$ nonsingular, skew-symmetric matrix. This definition can be extended to $2n\times 2n$ matrices with entries in other fields, such as the complex numbers, finite fields, p-adic numbers, and function fields.

Typically $\Omega$ is chosen to be the block matrix
$$\Omega = \begin{bmatrix}
0 & I_n \\
-I_n & 0 \\
\end{bmatrix},$$
where $I_n$ is the $n\times n$ identity matrix. The matrix $\Omega$ has determinant $+1$ and its inverse is $\Omega^{-1} = \Omega^\text{T} = -\Omega$.

== Properties ==
=== Generators for symplectic matrices ===
Every symplectic matrix has determinant $+1$, and the $2n\times 2n$ symplectic matrices with real entries form a subgroup of the general linear group $\mathrm{GL}(2n;\mathbb{R})$ under matrix multiplication since being symplectic is a property stable under matrix multiplication. Topologically, this symplectic group is a connected noncompact real Lie group of real dimension $n(2n+1)$, and is denoted $\mathrm{Sp}(2n;\mathbb{R})$. The symplectic group can be defined as the set of linear transformations that preserve the symplectic form of a real symplectic vector space.

This symplectic group has a distinguished set of generators, which can be used to find all possible symplectic matrices. This includes the following sets
$$\begin{align}
D(n) =& \left\{
\begin{pmatrix}
A & 0 \\
0 & (A^T)^{-1}
\end{pmatrix} : A \in \text{GL}(n;\mathbb{R})
\right\} \\
N(n) =& \left\{
\begin{pmatrix}
I_n & B \\
0 & I_n
\end{pmatrix} : B \in \text{Sym}(n;\mathbb{R})
\right\}
\end{align}$$
where $\text{Sym}(n;\mathbb{R})$ is the set of $n\times n$ symmetric matrices. Then, $\mathrm{Sp}(2n;\mathbb{R})$ is generated by the set^{p. 2}
$$\{\Omega \} \cup D(n) \cup N(n)$$
of matrices. In other words, any symplectic matrix can be constructed by multiplying matrices in $D(n)$ and $N(n)$ together, along with some power of $\Omega$.

=== Inverse matrix ===
Every symplectic matrix is invertible with the inverse matrix given by
$$M^{-1} = \Omega^{-1} M^\text{T} \Omega.$$
Furthermore, the product of two symplectic matrices is, again, a symplectic matrix. This gives the set of all symplectic matrices the structure of a group. There exists a natural manifold structure on this group which makes it into a (real or complex) Lie group called the symplectic group.

=== Determinantal properties ===
It follows easily from the definition that the determinant of any symplectic matrix is ±1. Actually, it turns out that the determinant is always +1 for any field. One way to see this is through the use of the Pfaffian and the identity
$$\mbox{Pf}(M^\text{T} \Omega M) = \det(M)\mbox{Pf}(\Omega).$$
Since $M^\text{T} \Omega M = \Omega$ and $\mbox{Pf}(\Omega) \neq 0$ we have that $\det(M) = 1$.

When the underlying field is real or complex, one can also show this by factoring the inequality $\det(M^\text{T} M + I) \ge 1$.

=== Block form of symplectic matrices ===
Suppose Ω is given in the standard form and let $M$ be a $2n\times 2n$ block matrix given by
$$M = \begin{pmatrix}A & B \\ C & D\end{pmatrix}$$

where $A,B,C,D$ are $n\times n$ matrices. The condition for $M$ to be symplectic is equivalent to the two following equivalent conditions

$A^\text{T}C,B^\text{T}D$ symmetric, and $A^\text{T} D - C^\text{T} B = I$

$AB^\text{T},CD^\text{T}$ symmetric, and $AD^\text{T} - BC^\text{T} = I$

The second condition comes from the fact that if $M$ is symplectic, then $M^T$ is also symplectic. When $n=1$ these conditions reduce to the single condition $\det(M)=1$. Thus a $2\times 2$ matrix is symplectic if and only if it has unit determinant.

==== Inverse matrix of block matrix ====
With $\Omega$ in standard form, the inverse of $M$ is given by
$$M^{-1} = \Omega^{-1} M^\text{T} \Omega=\begin{pmatrix}D^\text{T} & -B^\text{T} \\-C^\text{T} & A^\text{T}\end{pmatrix}.$$
The group has dimension $n(2n+1)$. This can be seen by noting that $( M^\text{T} \Omega M)^\text{T} = -M^\text{T} \Omega M$ is anti-symmetric. Since the space of anti-symmetric matrices has dimension $\binom{2n}{2},$ the identity $M^\text{T} \Omega M = \Omega$ imposes $2n \choose 2$ constraints on the $(2n)^2$ coefficients of $M$ and leaves $M$ with $n(2n+1)$ independent coefficients.

== Symplectic transformations ==
In the abstract formulation of linear algebra, matrices are replaced with linear transformations of finite-dimensional vector spaces. The abstract analog of a symplectic matrix is a symplectic transformation of a symplectic vector space. Briefly, a symplectic vector space $(V,\omega)$ is a $2n$-dimensional vector space $V$ equipped with a nondegenerate, skew-symmetric bilinear form $\omega$ called the symplectic form.

A symplectic transformation is then a linear transformation $L:V\to V$ which preserves $\omega$, i.e.
$$\omega(Lu, Lv) = \omega(u, v).$$
Fixing a basis for $V$, $\omega$ can be written as a matrix $\Omega$ and $L$ as a matrix $M$. The condition that $L$ be a symplectic transformation is precisely the condition that M be a symplectic matrix:
$$M^\text{T} \Omega M = \Omega.$$

Under a change of basis, represented by a matrix A, we have
$$\Omega \mapsto A^\text{T} \Omega A$$
$$M \mapsto A^{-1} M A.$$
One can always bring $\Omega$ to either the standard form given in the introduction or the block diagonal form described below by a suitable choice of A.

== The matrix Ω ==
Symplectic matrices are defined relative to a fixed nonsingular, skew-symmetric matrix $\Omega$. As explained in the previous section, $\Omega$ can be thought of as the coordinate representation of a nondegenerate skew-symmetric bilinear form. It is a basic result in linear algebra that any two such matrices differ from each other by a change of basis.

The most common alternative to the standard $\Omega$ given above is the block diagonal form
$$\Omega = \begin{bmatrix}
\begin{matrix}0 & 1\\ -1 & 0\end{matrix} & & 0 \\
& \ddots & \\
0 & & \begin{matrix}0 & 1 \\ -1 & 0\end{matrix}
\end{bmatrix}.$$
This choice differs from the previous one by a permutation of basis vectors.

Sometimes the notation $J$ is used instead of $\Omega$ for the skew-symmetric matrix. This is a particularly unfortunate choice as it leads to confusion with the notion of a complex structure, which often has the same coordinate expression as $\Omega$ but represents a very different structure. A complex structure $J$ is the coordinate representation of a linear transformation that squares to $-I_n$, whereas $\Omega$ is the coordinate representation of a nondegenerate skew-symmetric bilinear form. One could easily choose bases in which $J$ is not skew-symmetric or $\Omega$ does not square to $-I_n$.

Given a hermitian structure on a vector space, $J$ and $\Omega$ are related via
$$\Omega_{ab} = -g_{ac}{J^c}_b$$
where $g_{ac}$ is the metric. That $J$ and $\Omega$ usually have the same coordinate expression (up to an overall sign) is simply a consequence of the fact that the metric g is usually the identity matrix.

== Diagonalization and decomposition ==
- For any positive definite symmetric $2n\times 2n$ real symplectic matrix $S$, there is a symplectic unitary $U$,
  $$U \in \mathrm{U}(2n,\mathbb{R}) \cap \operatorname{Sp}(2n,\mathbb{R}) = \mathrm{O}(2n) \cap \operatorname{Sp}(2n,\mathbb{R}),$$
  such that
  $$S = U^\text{T} D U \quad \text{for} \quad D = \operatorname{diag}(\lambda_1,\ldots,\lambda_n,\lambda_1^{-1},\ldots,\lambda_n^{-1}),$$
  where the diagonal elements of $D$ are the eigenvalues of $S$.
- Any real symplectic matrix S has a polar decomposition of the form:
  $$S = UR,$$
  where
  $$U \in \operatorname{Sp}(2n,\mathbb{R})\cap\operatorname{U}(2n,\mathbb{R}),$$
  and
  $$R \in \operatorname{Sp}(2n,\mathbb{R})\cap\operatorname{Sym}_+(2n,\mathbb{R}).$$
- Any real symplectic matrix can be decomposed as a product of three matrices:
  $$S = O\begin{pmatrix}D & 0 \\ 0 & D^{-1}\end{pmatrix}O',$$
  where $O$ and $O'$ are both symplectic and orthogonal, and $D$ is positive-definite and diagonal. This decomposition is closely related to the singular value decomposition of a matrix and is known as an 'Euler' or 'Bloch-Messiah' decomposition.
- The set of orthogonal symplectic matrices forms a (maximal) compact subgroup of the symplectic group. This set is isomorphic to the set of unitary matrices of dimension $n$, $\mathrm{U}(2n,\mathbb{R}) \cap \operatorname{Sp}(2n,\mathbb{R}) = \mathrm{O}(2n) \cap \operatorname{Sp}(2n,\mathbb{R}) \cong \mathrm{U}(n,\mathbb{C})$. Every symplectic orthogonal matrix can be written as
  $$\begin{pmatrix} \Re(V) & -\Im(V) \\ \Im(V) & \Re(V) \end{pmatrix} = \left[\frac{1}{\sqrt{2}}\begin{pmatrix} I_n & i  I_n \\ I_n & -i I_n \end{pmatrix}  \right]^\dagger \begin{pmatrix} V & 0 \\ 0 & V^* \end{pmatrix} \left[\frac{1}{\sqrt{2}}\begin{pmatrix} I_n & i  I_n \\ I_n & -i I_n \end{pmatrix}  \right],$$	2
  with $V \in \mathrm{U}(n,\mathbb{C})$.
  This equation implies that every symplectic orthogonal matrix has determinant equal to +1 and thus that this is true for all symplectic matrices as its polar decomposition is itself given in terms symplectic matrices.

== Complex matrices ==
If instead M is a 2n × 2n matrix with complex entries, the definition is not standard throughout the literature. Many authors adjust the definition above to

$$M^* \Omega M = \Omega\,.$$	3

where M^{*} denotes the conjugate transpose of M. In this case, the determinant may not be 1, but will have absolute value 1. In the 2×2 case (n=1), M will be the product of a real symplectic matrix and a complex number of absolute value 1.

Other authors retain the definition (1) for complex matrices and call matrices satisfying (3) conjugate symplectic.

== Applications ==
Transformations described by symplectic matrices play an important role in quantum optics and in continuous-variable quantum information theory. For instance, symplectic matrices can be used to describe Gaussian (Bogoliubov) transformations of a quantum state of light. In turn, the Bloch-Messiah decomposition (2) means that such an arbitrary Gaussian transformation can be represented as a set of two passive linear-optical interferometers (corresponding to orthogonal matrices O and O' ) intermitted by a layer of active non-linear squeezing transformations (given in terms of the matrix D). In fact, one can circumvent the need for such in-line active squeezing transformations if two-mode squeezed vacuum states are available as a prior resource only.

== See also ==
- Symplectic vector space
- Symplectic group
- Symplectic representation
- Orthogonal matrix
- Unitary matrix
- Hamiltonian mechanics
- Linear complex structure
- Williamson theorem
- Hamiltonian matrix
