= Rachel Sarah Herz =

American-Canadian psychologist

Rachel Herz
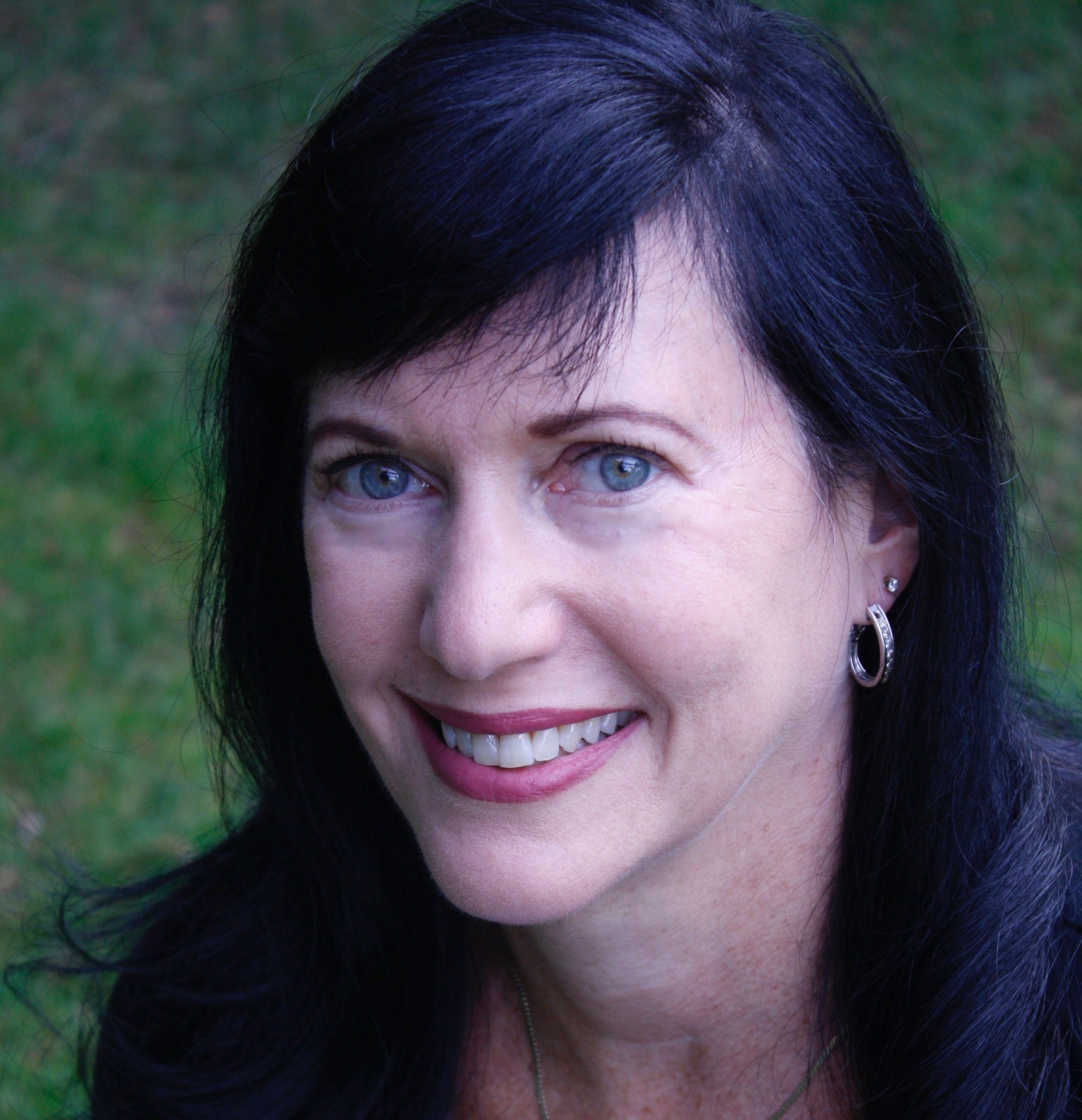
- Writing career
- Notable works: The Scent of Desire, That's Disgusting, and Why You Eat What You Eat
- Website: www.rachelherz.com

Rachel Sarah Herz is a Canadian and American psychologist and cognitive neuroscientist, recognized for her research on the psychology of smell.

== Background ==
Rachel Herz completed her undergraduate degree in psychology and biology at Queen's University in Kingston, Ontario, and an MA and PhD in the Psychology Department at the University of Toronto. After completing her PhD in 1992, she won a Natural Sciences and Engineering Research Council (NSERC) Post-Doctoral Award and took her research to the University of British Columbia. In 1994, she received the Ajinomoto USA Inaugural Award for Promising Young Scientists and joined the Monell Chemical Senses Center in Philadelphia as an assistant member.

In 2000, Herz joined the faculty at Brown University, first as a member of the Psychology Department and now as an adjunct assistant professor in the Department of Psychiatry and Human Behavior of Brown University Medical School. She was part-time faculty in the Department of Psychology and Neuroscience at Boston College from 2013-2022. Herz is a multiple TED-X speaker and since the mid-1990s Herz has been consulting for many of the world's leading multinational fragrance and flavor companies and regularly lectures to national and international audiences.

In 2004 Herz had to change her relationship with Brown University to a more limited involvement so that she could pursue other creative enterprises. It was at this time that she began writing The Scent of Desire: Discovering Our Enigmatic Sense of Smell (William Morrow/Harper Collins Publishers) as well as working on other means to educate and stimulate the general public about the chemical senses. Her commercial ventures include The Educated Palate.

Herz has Canadian and American citizenship. Her father was the mathematician Carl S. Herz.

== Psychology of smell ==
Her work examines with how language and emotion can affect odor perception and her laboratory has empirically demonstrated the first instance of olfactory illusions created by words alone. Herz also studies how we perceive food and how food-based emotions influence us. Theoretically guided by perspectives from cognitive psychology and evolutionary biology, Herz uses psychophysical, self-report, cognitive-behavioral and neurological techniques, including functional magnetic resonance imaging (fMRI), to investigate these topics.

== Selected articles ==
- Herz, R.S. (1998). "Are odors the best cues to memory? A cross-modal comparison of associative memory stimuli." Annals of the New York Academy Sciences, 855, 670–674.
- Herz, R.S. (2000). "Scents of Time." The Sciences (July/August), 34–39.
- Herz, R.S., & von Clef, J. (2001). "The influence of verbal labeling on the perception of odors: Evidence for olfactory illusions?" Perception, 30, 381–391.
- Herz, R.S. (2001). "Ah, sweet skunk: Why we like or dislike what we smell." Cerebrum, Vol.3(4), 31–47.
- Herz, R.S., & Inzlicht, M. (2002). "Gender differences in response to physical and social signals involved in human mate selection: The importance of smell for women." Evolution and Human Behavior, 23, 359–364.
- Herz, R.S., Eliassen, J.C., Beland, S.L., & T. Souza. (2003). "Neuroimaging evidence for the emotional potency of odor-evoked memory." Neuropsychologia, 42, 371–378.
- Carskadon, M., & Herz, R.S. (2004). "Minimal olfactory perception during sleep: Why odor alarms will not work for humans." Sleep, 27, 402–405.
- Herz, R.S., Beland, S.L. & Hellerstein, M. (2004). "Changing odor hedonic perception through emotional associations in humans." International Journal of Comparative Psychology, 17, 315–339.
- Herz, R.S., Schankler, C. & Beland, S. (2004). "Olfaction, emotion and associative learning: Effects on motivated behavior." Motivation and Emotion, 28, 363–383.
- Herz, R.S. (2006). "I know what I like: Understanding odor preferences." In J. Drobnick (Ed), The Smell Culture Reader. (pp. 190 – 203). Oxford: Berg.
- Herz, R.S. (2009). "Aromatherapy facts and fictions: A scientific analysis of olfactory effects on mood, physiology and behavior." International Journal of Neuroscience, 119, 263–290.
- Herz, R. S. (2011). PROP taste sensitivity is related to visceral but not moral disgust. Chemosensory Perception, 4, 72–79. doi:10.1007/s12078-011-9089-1
- Herz, R.S. & Hinds, A. (2013). Stealing is not gross: Language distinguishes visceral disgust from moral violations. American Journal of Psychology, 126, 275–286. doi: 10.5406/amerjpsyc.126.3.0275
- Herz, R.S. (2014). Verbal priming and taste sensitivity make moral transgressions gross. Behavioral Neuroscience, 128, 20–28. doi:10.1037/a0035468
- Sugiyama, H., Oshida, A., Thueneman, P., Littell, S., Katayama, A., Kashiwagi, M., Hikichi, S. & Herz, R.S. (2015). Proustian products are preferred: The relationship between odor-evoked memories and product evaluation. Chemosensory Perception, 8, 1-10. doi: 10.1007/s12078-015-9182-y
- Herz, R.S. (2016). Birth of a Neurogastronomy Nation: The inaugural symposium of the international society of neurogastronomy. Chemical Senses, 41, 101–103. doi:10.1093/chemse/bjv073
- Herz, R. S. (2016). The role of odor-evoked memory in psychological and physiological health. Brain Sciences, 6(3),22. doi:10.3390/brainsci6030022.
- Ershadi, M., Russell, J.A. & Herz, R.S. (2017). The (non)-effect of induced emotion on desire for different types of foods. Food Quality and Preference, 62, 214–17. doi.org/10.1016/j.foodqual.2017.06.009
- Herz, R.S., Van Reen, E., Barker, D., Hilditch, C., Bartz, A. & Carskadon, M.A. (2018). The influence of circadian timing on odor detection. Chemical Senses, 43, 45-51. doi:10.1093/chemse/bjx067
- White, T.L., Cunningham, C. & Herz, R.S., (2018). Individual differences and the ‘selfish’ relationship between empathy and disgust. American Journal of Psychology, 131, 439–450.
- Sayette, M.A. Marchetti, M., Herz, R.S., Martin, L.M. & Bowdring, M.A. (2019). Pleasant olfactory cues can reduce cigarette craving. Journal of Abnormal Psychology, 128, 327-340
- Herz, R.S., Van Reen, E., Gredvig-Ardito C. & Carskadon, M.A. (2020). Insights into smell and taste sensitivity in normal weight and overweight-obese adolescents. Physiology & Behavior, 221.
- Herz, R.S., Herzog, E. D., Merrow, M & Noya, S.B. (2021). The circadian clock, the brain, and COVID-19: the cases of olfaction and the timing of sleep. Journal of Biological Rhythms, 36(5), 423-431. doi: 10.1177/07487304211031206
- Herz, R.S. (2021). Olfactory Virtual Reality: A new frontier in the treatment and prevention of posttraumatic stress disorder. Brain Sciences, 11, 1070. https://doi.org/10.3390/brainsci11081070
- Herz, R.S. & Bajec, M. R. (2022). Your money or your sense of smell? A comparative analysis of the sensory and psychological value of olfaction. Brain Sciences, 12, 299. https://doi.org/10.3390/brainsci12030299
- Herz, R.S., Larsson, M., & Trujillo, R., Casola, M.C., Ahmed, F.K., Lipe, S. & Brashear M.E. (2022). A three-factor benefits framework for understanding consumer preference for scented household products: psychological interactions and implications for future development. Cognitive Research: Principles and Implications, 7(28), 1-20. https://doi.org/10.1186/s41235-022-00378-6

== Books ==
- The Scent of Desire: Discovering Our Enigmatic Sense of Smell, New York: William Morrow/HarperCollins Publishers. ISBN 978-0-06-082537-9.
- That's Disgusting: Unraveling the Mysteries of Repulsion, New York: W. W. Norton & Company. ISBN 978-0-393-07647-9
- Why You Eat What You Eat: The Science Behind our Relationship with Food, New York: W. W. Norton & Company. ISBN 978-0-393-24331-4

== Outreach ==
Herz serves on several advisory boards, including the UK charity for smell loss, Fifth Sense. Herz serves on several advisory boards and councils, including the Smell and Taste Association of North America, the UK charity for smell loss, Fifth Sense, the Association for Chemoreception Sciences and OVRTechnology Her research on sensory memory was on display from 2001 to 2006 in a traveling Smithsonian Institution exhibit called "Brain: The world inside your head". She has given numerous interviews, including for: CBC, The Science of the Senses, @Discovery.ca (The Discovery Channel, Canada), The Discovery Channel USA, ABC Discovery News, ABC News, The BBC, National Geographic, NBC Nightly news, Korean Public Broadcasting, ABC The Chronicle, FOX News, National Public Radio, CBS The Early Show. She is also featured in Mystify: Michael Hutchence.
