= Majorization =

Preorder on vectors of real numbers

In mathematics, majorization is a preorder on vectors of real numbers. For two such vectors, $\mathbf{x},\ \mathbf{y} \in \mathbb{R}^n$, we say that $\mathbf{x}$ weakly majorizes (or dominates) $\mathbf{y}$ from below, commonly denoted $\mathbf{x} \succ_w \mathbf{y},$ when

$\sum_{i=1}^k x_i^{\downarrow} \geq \sum_{i=1}^k y_i^{\downarrow}$ for all $k=1,\,\dots,\,n$,

where $x_i^{\downarrow}$ denotes the $i$^{th} largest entry of $\mathbf{x}$. If $\mathbf{x}, \mathbf{y}$ further satisfy $\sum_{i=1}^n x_i = \sum_{i=1}^n y_i$, we say that $\mathbf{x}$ majorizes (or dominates) $\mathbf{y}$, commonly denoted $\mathbf{x} \succ \mathbf{y}$.

Both weak majorization and majorization are partial orders for vectors whose entries are non-decreasing, but only a preorder for general vectors, since majorization is agnostic to the ordering of the entries in vectors, e.g., the statement $(1,2)\prec (0,3)$ is simply equivalent to $(2,1)\prec (3,0)$.

Specifically, $\mathbf{x} \succ \mathbf{y} \wedge \mathbf{y} \succ \mathbf{x}$ if and only if $\mathbf{x}, \mathbf{y}$ are permutations of each other. Similarly for $\succ_w$.

Majorizing also sometimes refers to entrywise ordering, e.g. the real-valued function f majorizes the real-valued function g when $f(x) \geq g(x)$ for all $x$ in the domain, or other technical definitions, such as majorizing measures in probability theory.

== Equivalent conditions ==
=== Geometric definition ===
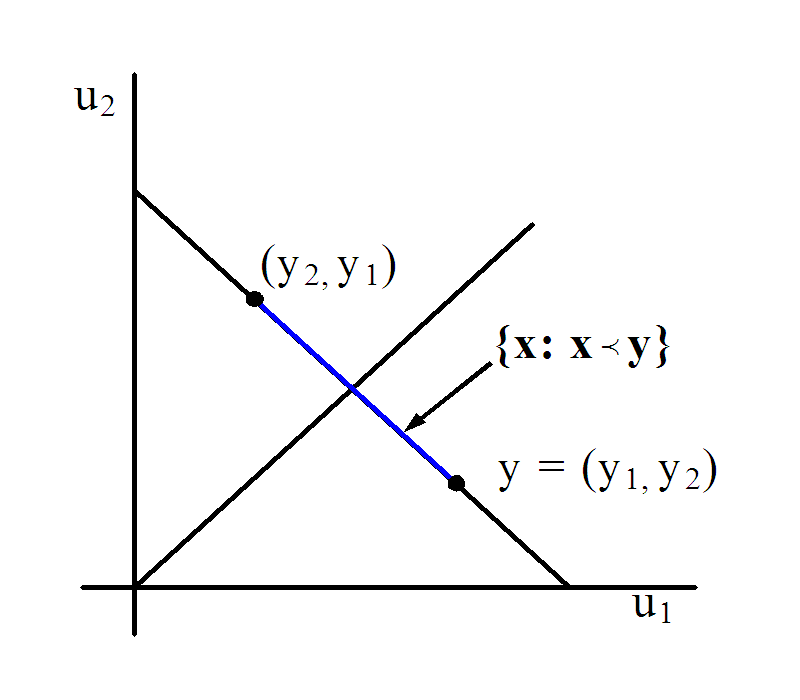
Figure 1. 2D majorization example

For $\mathbf{x},\ \mathbf{y} \in \mathbb{R}^n,$ we have $\mathbf{x} \prec \mathbf{y}$ if and only if $\mathbf{x}$ is in the convex hull of all vectors obtained by permuting the coordinates of $\mathbf{y}$. This is equivalent to saying that $\mathbf{x} = \mathbf{D}\mathbf{y}$ for some doubly stochastic matrix $\mathbf{D}$. In particular, $\mathbf{x}$ can be written as a convex combination of $n$ permutations of $\mathbf{y}$. In other words, $\mathbf{x}$ is in the permutahedron of $\mathbf{y}$.

Figure 1 displays the convex hull in 2D for the vector $\mathbf{y}=(3,\,1)$. Notice that the center of the convex hull, which is an interval in this case, is the vector $\mathbf{x}=(2,\,2)$. This is the "smallest" vector satisfying $\mathbf{x} \prec \mathbf{y}$ for this given vector $\mathbf{y}$. Figure 2 shows the convex hull in 3D. The center of the convex hull, which is a 2D polygon in this case, is the "smallest" vector $\mathbf{x}$ satisfying $\mathbf{x} \prec \mathbf{y}$ for this given vector $\mathbf{y}$.

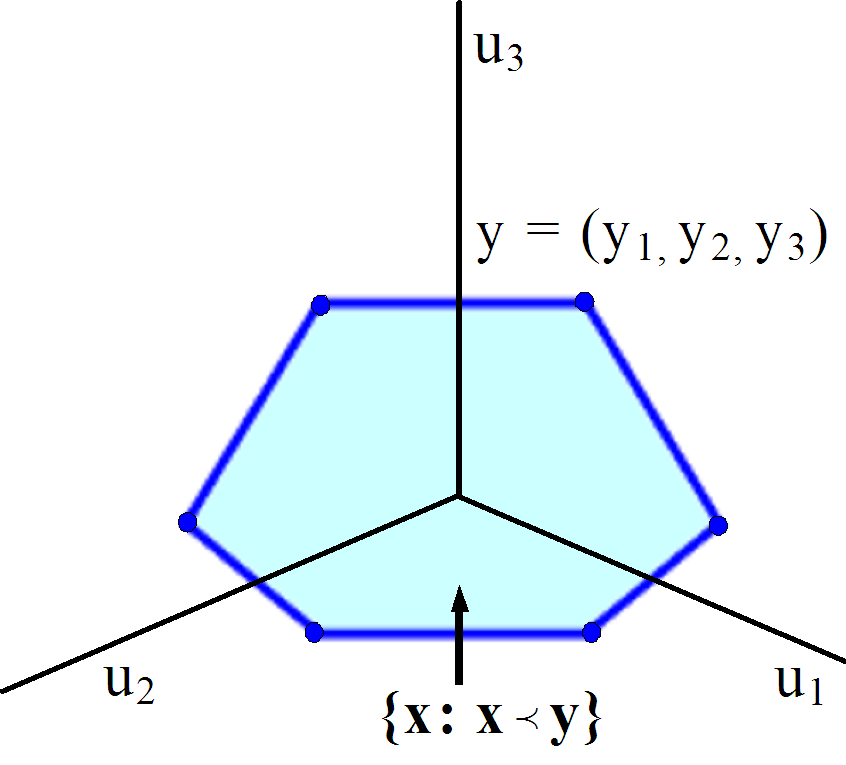
Figure 2. 3D Majorization Example

=== Other definitions ===
Each of the following statements is true if and only if $\mathbf{x}\succ \mathbf{y}$.

- From $\mathbf{x}$ we can produce $\mathbf{y}$ by a finite sequence of "Robin Hood operations" where we replace two elements $x_i$ and $x_j < x_i$ with $x_i-\varepsilon$ and $x_j+\varepsilon$, respectively, for some $\varepsilon \in (0, x_i-x_j)$.
- For every convex function $h:\mathbb{R}\to \mathbb{R}$, $\sum_{i=1}^d h(x_i) \geq \sum_{i=1}^d h(y_i)$.
  - In fact, a special case suffices: $\sum_i{x_i}=\sum_i{y_i}$ and, for every t, $\sum_{i=1}^d \max(0,x_i-t) \geq\sum_{i=1}^d \max(0,y_i-t)$.
- For every $t \in \mathbb{R}$, $\sum_{j=1}^d |x_j-t| \geq \sum_{j=1}^d |y_j-t|$.
- Three vectors and their concave curves, illustrating $x \succ z, y \succ z, \neg(x \succ y), \neg(y \succ x)$.
  Each vector $\mathbf{x}$ can be plotted as a concave curve by connecting $(0,0), (1, x_1^{\downarrow}), (2, x_1^{\downarrow}+x_2^{\downarrow}), \dots, (n, x_1^{\downarrow}+x_2^{\downarrow} + \dots +x_n^{\downarrow})$. Then $\mathbf{x}\succ \mathbf{y}$ is equivalent to the curve of $\mathbf{x}$ being higher than that of $\mathbf{y}$.

== Examples ==
Among non-negative vectors with three components, $(1, 0, 0)$ and permutations of it majorize all other vectors $(p_1, p_2, p_3)$ such that $p_1 + p_2 + p_3 = 1$. For example, $(1, 0, 0) \succ (1/2, 0, 1/2)$. Similarly, $(1/3, 1/3, 1/3)$ is majorized by all other such vectors, so $(1/2, 0, 1/2) \succ (1/3, 1/3, 1/3)$.

This behavior extends to general-length probability vectors: the singleton vector majorizes all other probability vectors, and the uniform distribution is majorized by all probability vectors.

== Schur convexity ==
A function $f:\mathbb{R}^n \to \mathbb{R}$ is said to be Schur convex when $\mathbf{x} \succ \mathbf{y}$ implies $f(\mathbf{x}) \geq f(\mathbf{y})$. Hence, Schur-convex functions translate the ordering of vectors to a standard ordering in $\mathbb{R}$. Similarly, $f(\mathbf{x})$ is Schur concave when $\mathbf{x} \succ \mathbf{y}$ implies $f(\mathbf{x}) \leq f(\mathbf{y}).$

An example of a Schur-convex function is the max function, $\max(\mathbf{x})=x_{1}^{\downarrow}$. Schur convex functions are necessarily symmetric that the entries of it argument can be switched without modifying the value of the function. Therefore, linear functions, which are convex, are not Schur-convex unless they are symmetric. If a function is symmetric and convex, then it is Schur-convex.

== Generalizations ==
Majorization can be generalized to the Lorenz ordering, a partial order on distribution functions. For example, a wealth distribution is Lorenz-greater than another if its Lorenz curve lies below the other. As such, a Lorenz-greater wealth distribution has a higher Gini coefficient, and has more income disparity.

The majorization preorder can be naturally extended to density matrices in the context of quantum information. In particular, $\rho\succ\rho'$ exactly when $\mathrm{spec}[\rho]\succ\mathrm{spec}[\rho']$ (where $\mathrm{spec}$ denotes the state's spectrum).

Similarly, one can say a Hermitian operator, $\mathbf{H}$, majorizes another, $\mathbf{M}$, if the set of eigenvalues of $\mathbf{H}$ majorizes that of $\mathbf{M}$.

== See also ==
- Muirhead's inequality
- Karamata's Inequality
- Schur-convex function
- Schur–Horn theorem relating diagonal entries of a matrix to its eigenvalues.
- For positive integer numbers, weak majorization is called Dominance order.
- Leximin order

== Software ==
- OCTAVE/MATLAB code to check majorization
