= Carl S. Herz =

American-Canadian mathematician (1930-1995)

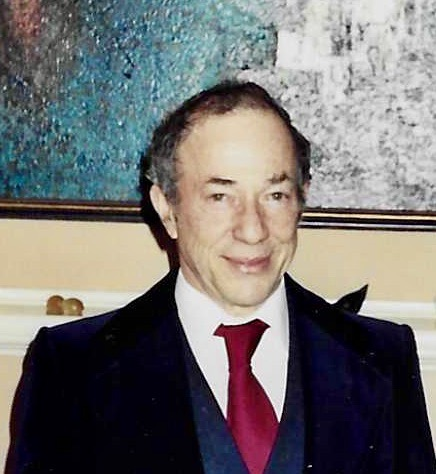
- Carl S. Herz, 1990
- Born: April 10, 1930; Rockville Center, Long Island, NY, USA
- Died: May 1, 1995 (aged 65); Montreal, Quebec, CA
- Citizenship: United States; Canada
- Education: Cornell University, B.Sc. Princeton University, Ph.D.
- Known for: Herz-Schur multiplier
- Spouse: Judith Scherer Herz
- Children: Rachel Sarah Herz; Nathaniel Herz
- Awards: Royal Society of Canada; Jeffery-Williams Prize
- Scientific career
- Fields: Mathematics; Harmonic Analysis
- Workplaces: Cornell University; McGill University
- Doctoral advisor: Salomon Bochner

Carl Samuel Herz (10 April 1930 – 1 May 1995) was an American-Canadian mathematician, specializing in harmonic analysis. His name is attached to the Herz–Schur multiplier. He held professorships at Cornell University and McGill University, where he was Peter Redpath Professor of Mathematics at the time of his death.

== Education and career ==
Herz received his bachelor's degree from Cornell University in 1950 and continued on as a mathematics graduate student at Princeton University. There he received a Ph.D. under the supervision of Salomon Bochner in 1953 with the dissertation "Bessel Functions of Matrix Argument". According to Tom H. Koornwinder, Herz's dissertation (published in the Annals of Mathematics in May 1955) "was a pioneering paper in the field of special functions in several variables associated with Lie groups and with root systems." Herz returned to Cornell as an instructor, rising in rank to assistant professor in 1955, associate professor in 1958, and full professor in 1963. He remained at Cornell until 1969. During the academic year 1969–1970 he worked at Brandeis University and then in 1970 joined the faculty of McGill University as full professor, where he remained until his death in 1995. During the academic year 1962–1963 Herz was a Sloan Fellow at Université de Paris-Sud at Orsay, where he established close ties with mathematicians there that led to frequent academic visits at Orsay of a month or two each year. In the academic years 1957–1958 and 1976–1977 he was a visiting scholar at the Institute for Advanced Study.

Herz did mathematical research on spectral synthesis, positive-definite functions, Fourier transforms on convex sets, potential theory, H_{p}, and BMO. According to Nicholas Varopoulos, Herz made contributions "to the theory of symmetric spaces, Lie groups and the heat kernel on these; among other things he succeeded in classifying all faithful representations of Lie groups by contact transformations of a compact manifold."

In 1978 he was elected of a Fellow of the Royal Society of Canada. In 1986 he was awarded the Jeffery–Williams Prize by the Canadian Mathematical Society. He was the president of the Canadian Mathematical Society in 1987–1989. The Institut des sciences mathématiques, a consortium of eight Quebec universities of which Herz was Director at the time of his death, established the Carl Herz Prize in his honor.

== Personal life ==
Herz met Judith Scherer, a Professor of English, while teaching at Cornell. They were married in 1960. They had two children, Rachel and Nathaniel. Rachel is a psychologist and cognitive neuroscientist, specializing in the psychology of smell. Nathaniel is a trained lawyer working as web developer.

== Selected publications ==
- Herz, C. S. (1954). "On the mean inversion of Fourier and Hankel transforms". Proc Natl Acad Sci U S A. 40 (10): 996–999. Bibcode:1954PNAS...40..996H. doi:10.1073/pnas.40.10.996. PMC 534209. PMID 16589594.
- Herz, Carl S. (May 1955). "Bessel functions of matrix argument". Annals of Mathematics. 61 (3): 474–523. doi:10.2307/1969810. JSTOR 1969810.
- Herz, C. S. (1956). "Spectral synthesis for the Cantor set". Proc Natl Acad Sci U S A. 42 (1): 42–43. Bibcode:1956PNAS...42...42H. doi:10.1073/pnas.42.1.42. PMC 534229. PMID 16589812.
- "A note on summability methods and spectral theory". Trans. Amer. Math. Soc. 86: 506–510. 1957. doi:10.1090/s0002-9947-1957-0093685-2. MR 0093685.
- "A note on the span of translations in L^{p}". Proc. Amer. Math. Soc. 8: 724–727. 1957. doi:10.1090/s0002-9939-1957-0088604-4. MR 0088604.
- Herz, Carl S. (1960). "The spectral theory of bounded functions". Trans. Amer. Math. Soc. 94 (2): 181–232. doi:10.1090/s0002-9947-1960-0131779-3. MR 0131779.
- Herz, C. S. (1961). "A maximal theorem". Proc. Amer. Math. Soc. 12 (2): 229–233. doi:10.1090/s0002-9939-1961-0151861-0. MR 0151861.
- Herz, C. S. (1963). "A class of negative-definite functions". Proc. Amer. Math. Soc. 14 (4): 670–676. doi:10.1090/s0002-9939-1963-0158251-7. MR 0158251.
- Herz, Carl (1971). "The theory of p-spaces with an application to convolution operators". Trans. Amer. Math. Soc. 154: 69–82. doi:10.1090/s0002-9947-1971-0272952-0. MR 0272952.
- Herz, Carl (1974). "Bounded mean oscillation and regulated martingales". Trans. Amer. Math. Soc. 193: 199–215. doi:10.1090/s0002-9947-1974-0353447-5. MR 0353447.
- Herz, Carl (1991). "The derivative of the exponential map". Proc. Amer. Math. Soc. 112 (3): 909–911. doi:10.1090/s0002-9939-1991-1086328-8. MR 1086328.
