= Williamson theorem =

Theorem about diagonalizing matrices

In the context of linear algebra and symplectic geometry, the Williamson theorem concerns the diagonalization of positive definite matrices through symplectic matrices.

More precisely, given a strictly positive-definite $2n\times 2n$ Hermitian real matrix $M\in\mathbb{R}^{2n\times 2n}$, the theorem ensures the existence of a real symplectic matrix $S\in\mathbf{Sp}(2n,\mathbb{R})$, and a diagonal positive real matrix $D\in\mathbb{R}^{n\times n}$, such that
$$SMS^T = I_2\otimes D \equiv D\oplus D,$$
where $I_2$ denotes the 2x2 identity matrix.

== Proof ==
The derivation of the result hinges on a few basic observations:

1. The real matrix $M^{-1/2} (J\otimes I_n) M^{-1/2}$, with
  $$J\equiv\begin{pmatrix}0&1\\-1&0\end{pmatrix}$$
  , is well-defined and skew-symmetric.
2. For any invertible skew-symmetric real matrix $A\in\mathbb{R}^{2n\times 2n}$, there is $O\in\mathbf{O}(2n)$ such that $OAO^T= J\otimes \Lambda$, where $\Lambda$ a real positive-definite diagonal matrix containing the singular values of $A$.
3. For any orthogonal $O\in\mathbf O(2n)$, the matrix $S= \left(I_2\otimes\sqrt D\right)O M^{-1/2}$ is such that $SMS^T=I_2\otimes D$.
4. If $O\in\mathbf O(2n)$ diagonalizes $M^{-1/2} (J\otimes I_n) M^{-1/2}$, meaning it satisfies
  $$OM^{-1/2} (J\otimes I_n) M^{-1/2}O^T=J\otimes\Lambda,$$
  then $S= \left(I_2\otimes\sqrt D\right)O M^{-1/2}$ is such that
  $$S(J\otimes I_n)S^T=J\otimes (D\Lambda) .$$
  Therefore, taking $D=\Lambda^{-1}$, the matrix $S$ is also a symplectic matrix, satisfying $S(J\otimes I_n)S^T=J\otimes I_n$.
