= Herz–Schur multiplier =

In the mathematical field of representation theory, a Herz–Schur multiplier (named after Carl S. Herz and Issai Schur) is a special kind of mapping from a group to the field of complex numbers.

== Definition ==
Let Ψ be a mapping of a group G to the complex numbers. It is a Herz–Schur multiplier if the induced map Ψ: N(G) → N(G) is a completely positive map, where N(G) is the closure of the span M of the image of λ in B(ℓ^{2}(G)) with respect to the weak topology, λ is the left regular representation of G and Ψ is on M defined as

$$\Psi:~\sum\limits_{g\in G}\mu_g\lambda_g\mapsto\sum\limits_{g\in G}\psi(g)\mu_g\lambda_g.$$

== See also ==
- Figà-Talamanca–Herz algebra
- Fourier algebra
