= Rose Peltesohn =

German mathematician

Rose Pauline Peltesohn
- רוז פאולין פלטסון
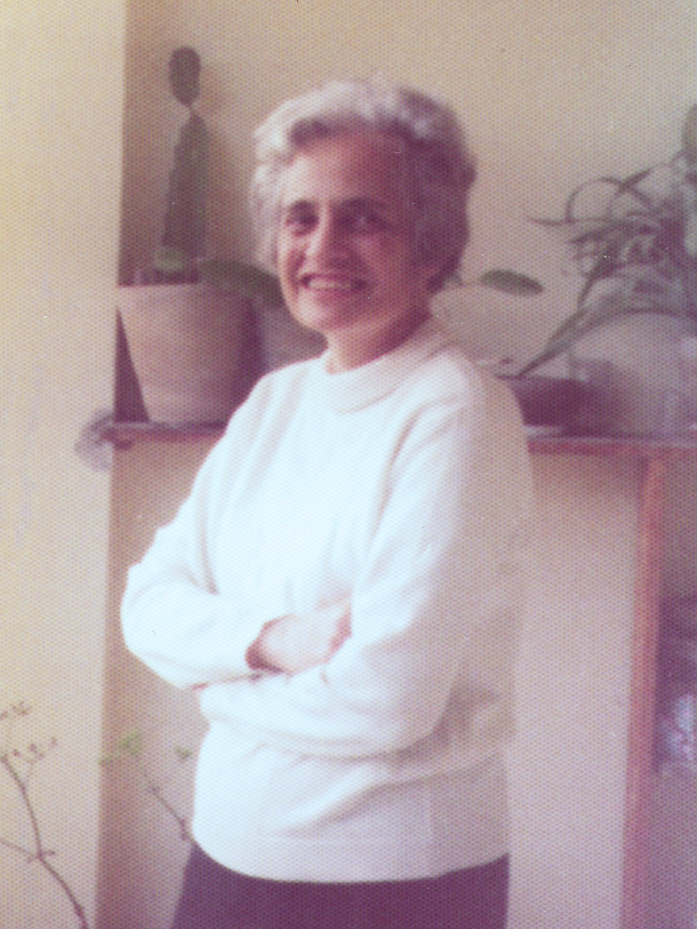
- Born: May 16, 1913; Berlin, Germany
- Died: March 21, 1998 (aged 84); Kfar Saba, Israel
- Education: Humboldt University
- Spouse: Gerhard Peltesohn
- Children: Ruth (born 1940), Judith (born 1943).
- Scientific career
- Fields: Combinatorics
- Workplaces: Berlin, Tel Aviv
- Thesis: Das Turnierproblem für Spiele zu je dreien (1936)
- Doctoral advisor: Issai Schur

Rose Pauline Peltesohn (Hebrew: רוז פאולין פלטסון; 16 May 1913 – 21 March 1998) was an Israeli mathematician of German origin.

== Life ==
Rose Peltesohn was the daughter of the physician Ludwig Peltesohn (1882–1937) and of Cilly Caro. After graduation (Abitur) in March 1931 she studied mathematics and physics at the University of Berlin and got her Ph.D. in Mathematics at 1936 with Issai Schur as supervisor (Das Turnierproblem für Spiele zu je dreien, The tournament problem for three person games). Her dissertation was valued opus valde laudabile^{(de)}. Being Jewish she emigrated through Italy to Palestine, arriving 1938. Between the years 1939–1942 she worked in a bank and later as a lawyer's secretary and translator in Tel Aviv. She married her cousin Gerhard Peltesohn, a lawyer (1909–1965), and they had two daughters, Ruth (born 1940) and Judith (born 1943).

== Solution of Heffter's Difference Problems ==
Peltesohn solved the Difference Problems of Lothar Heffter (1896) in combinatorics in 1939. A Difference Triple (a, b, c) is defined as three different elements from the set $1, 2,\dots, v-1$, whose sum $\bmod v$ equals zero ($a+b+c=0 \bmod v$) or for which one element $\bmod v$ equals the sum of the other two ($a+b=c \bmod v$).

- First Difference Problem of Heffter: Let $v=6 m+1$. Is there a partition of the set $1, 2,\ldots, 3m$ in difference triples?
- Second Difference Problem of Heffter: Let $v=6m+3$. Is there a partition of the set $1,2,\ldots,2m, 2m+2,\ldots, 3m+1$ in difference triples ?

Following Peltesohn, such a partition exists with the exception of the case v = 9.

An example of the partition for $v=13$ is: $(1,3,4)$ (with $1+3=4 \bmod 13$) and $(2,5,6)$ (with $2+5+6=13=0 \bmod 13$).

The solution of the Difference Problem of Heffter also gives a construction of cyclic Steiner triple systems.

== Literature ==
- Maximilian Pinl (1969). "Kollegen in einer dunklen Zeit". Jahresbericht Deutsche Mathematikervereinigung. 71: 171–228. Archived from the original on 2014-11-07. in particular pages 188–189
