= Schur's property =

Term from the theory of normed spaces

In mathematics, Schur's property, named after Issai Schur, is the property of normed spaces that is satisfied precisely if weak convergence of sequences entails convergence in norm.

== Motivation ==
When we are working in a normed space X and we have a sequence $(x_{n})$ that converges weakly to $x$, then a natural question arises. Does the sequence converge in perhaps a more desirable manner? If so, does the sequence converge to $x$ in norm? A canonical example of this property, and commonly used to illustrate the Schur property, is the $\ell_1$ sequence space.

== Definition ==
Suppose that we have a normed space $(X, \|\cdot\|)$, $x$ an arbitrary member of $X$, and $(x_{n})$ an arbitrary sequence in the space. We say that $X$ has Schur's property if $(x_{n})$ converging weakly to $x$ implies that $\lim_{n\to\infty} \Vert x_n - x\Vert = 0$. In other words, the weak and strong topologies share the same convergent sequences. Note however that weak and strong topologies are always distinct in infinite-dimensional space.

== Examples ==
The space ℓ^{1} of sequences whose series is absolutely convergent has the Schur property.

== Name ==
This property was named after the early 20th century mathematician Issai Schur who showed that ℓ^{1} had the above property in his 1921 paper.

== See also ==
- Radon-Riesz property for a similar property of normed spaces
- Schur's theorem
