= Schur test =

Inequality involving integral operators

In mathematical analysis, the Schur test, named after German mathematician Issai Schur, is a bound on the $L^2\to L^2$ operator norm of an integral operator in terms of its Schwartz kernel (see Schwartz kernel theorem).

Here is one version. Let $X,\,Y$ be two measurable spaces (such as $\mathbb{R}^n$). Let $\,T$ be an integral operator with the non-negative Schwartz kernel $\,K(x,y)$, $x\in X$, $y\in Y$:

$$T f(x)=\int_Y K(x,y)f(y)\,dy.$$

If there exist real functions $\,p(x)>0$ and $\,q(y)>0$ and numbers $\,\alpha,\beta>0$ such that

$$(1)\qquad \int_Y K(x,y)q(y)\,dy\le\alpha p(x)$$

for almost all $\,x$ and

$$(2)\qquad \int_X p(x)K(x,y)\,dx\le\beta q(y)$$

for almost all $\,y$, then $\,T$ extends to a continuous operator $T:L^2\to L^2$ with the operator norm

$$\Vert T\Vert_{L^2\to L^2} \le\sqrt{\alpha\beta}.$$

Such functions $\,p(x)$, $\,q(y)$ are called the Schur test functions.

In the original version, $\,T$ is a matrix and $\,\alpha=\beta=1$.

== Common usage and Young's inequality ==
A common usage of the Schur test is to take $\,p(x)=q(y)=1.$ Then we get:

$$\Vert T\Vert^2_{L^2\to L^2}\le
\sup_{x\in X}\int_Y|K(x,y)| \, dy
\cdot
\sup_{y\in Y}\int_X|K(x,y)| \, dx.$$

This inequality is valid no matter whether the Schwartz kernel $\,K(x,y)$ is non-negative or not.

A similar statement about $L^p\to L^q$ operator norms is known as Young's inequality for integral operators:

if

$$\sup_x\Big(\int_Y|K(x,y)|^r\,dy\Big)^{1/r} + \sup_y\Big(\int_X|K(x,y)|^r\,dx\Big)^{1/r}\le C,$$

where $r$ satisfies $\frac 1 r=1-\Big(\frac 1 p-\frac 1 q\Big)$, for some $1\le p\le q\le\infty$, then the operator $Tf(x)=\int_Y K(x,y)f(y)\,dy$ extends to a continuous operator $T:L^p(Y)\to L^q(X)$, with $\Vert T\Vert_{L^p\to L^q}\le C.$

== Proof ==
Using the Cauchy–Schwarz inequality and inequality (1), we get:

$$\begin{align} |Tf(x)|^2=\left|\int_Y K(x,y)f(y)\,dy\right|^2
&\le \left(\int_Y K(x,y)q(y)\,dy\right)
\left(\int_Y \frac{K(x,y)f(y)^2}{q(y)} dy\right)\\
&\le\alpha p(x)\int_Y \frac{K(x,y)f(y)^2}{q(y)} \, dy.
\end{align}$$

Integrating the above relation in $x$, using Fubini's Theorem, and applying inequality (2), we get:

$$\Vert T f\Vert_{L^2}^2
\le \alpha \int_Y \left(\int_X p(x)K(x,y)\,dx\right) \frac{f(y)^2}{q(y)} \, dy
\le\alpha\beta \int_Y f(y)^2 dy =\alpha\beta\Vert f\Vert_{L^2}^2.$$

It follows that $\Vert T f\Vert_{L^2}\le\sqrt{\alpha\beta}\Vert f\Vert_{L^2}$ for any $f\in L^2(Y)$.

== See also ==
- Hardy–Littlewood–Sobolev inequality
