= Schur-convex function =

Function in mathematical analysis

In mathematics, a Schur-convex function, also known as S-convex, isotonic function and order-preserving function is a function $f: \mathbb{R}^d\rightarrow \mathbb{R}$ that for all $x,y\in \mathbb{R}^d$ such that $x$ is majorized by $y$, one has that $f(x)\le f(y)$. Named after Issai Schur, Schur-convex functions are used in the study of majorization.

A function f is 'Schur-concave' if its negative, −f, is Schur-convex.

== Properties ==
Every function that is convex and symmetric (under permutations of the arguments) is also Schur-convex.

Every Schur-convex function is symmetric, but not necessarily convex.

If $f$ is (strictly) Schur-convex and $g$ is (strictly) monotonically increasing, then $g\circ f$ is (strictly) Schur-convex.

If $g$ is a convex function defined on a real interval, then $\sum_{i=1}^n g(x_i)$ is Schur-convex.

=== Schur–Ostrowski criterion ===
If f is symmetric and all first partial derivatives exist, then f is Schur-convex if and only if

$(x_i - x_j)\left(\frac{\partial f}{\partial x_i} - \frac{\partial f}{\partial x_j}\right) \ge 0$ for all $x \in \mathbb{R}^d$

holds for all $1\le i,j\le d$.

== Examples ==
- $f(x)=\min(x)$ is Schur-concave while $f(x)=\max(x)$ is Schur-convex. This can be seen directly from the definition.
- The Shannon entropy function $\sum_{i=1}^d{P_i \cdot \log_2{\frac{1}{P_i}}}$ is Schur-concave.
- The Rényi entropy function is also Schur-concave.
- $x \mapsto \sum_{i=1}^d{x_i^k},k \ge 1$ is Schur-convex if $k \geq 1$, and Schur-concave if $k \in (0, 1)$.
- The function $f(x) = \prod_{i=1}^d x_i$ is Schur-concave, when we assume all $x_i > 0$. In the same way, all the elementary symmetric functions are Schur-concave, when $x_i > 0$.
- A natural interpretation of majorization is that if $x \succ y$ then $x$ is more spread out than $y$. So it is natural to ask if statistical measures of variability are Schur-convex. The variance and standard deviation are Schur-convex functions, while the median absolute deviation is not.
- A probability example: If $X_1, \dots, X_n$ are exchangeable random variables, then the function $\text{E} \prod_{j=1}^n X_j^{a_j}$ is Schur-convex as a function of $a=(a_1, \dots, a_n)$, assuming that the expectations exist.
- The Gini coefficient is strictly Schur convex.

== See also ==
- Quasiconvex function
