= Issai Schur =

Russian and German mathematician (1875–1941)

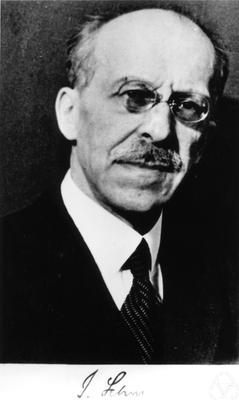
- Born: 10 January 1875; Mogilev, Russian Empire
- Died: 10 January 1941 (aged 66); Tel Aviv, Mandatory Palestine
- Known for: Schur decomposition; Schur's lemma; Schur complement
- Scientific career
- Fields: Mathematics
- Doctoral advisor: Georg Frobenius; Lazarus Fuchs
- Doctoral students: Richard Brauer; Robert Frucht; Maximilian Herzberger; Eberhard Hopf; Bernhard Neumann; Rose Peltesohn; Heinz Prüfer; Richard Rado; Isaac Jacob Schoenberg; Arnold Scholz; Wilhelm Specht; Karl Dörge; Wolfgang Hahn

Issai Schur (10 January 1875 – 10 January 1941) was a Russian mathematician who worked in Germany for most of his life. He studied at the University of Berlin. He obtained his doctorate in 1901, became lecturer in 1903 and, after a stay at the University of Bonn, professor in 1919.

As a student of Ferdinand Georg Frobenius, he worked on group representations (the subject with which he is most closely associated), but also in combinatorics and number theory and even theoretical physics. He is perhaps best known today for his result on the existence of the Schur decomposition and for his work on group representations (Schur's lemma).

Schur published under the name of both I. Schur, and J. Schur, the latter especially in Journal für die reine und angewandte Mathematik. This has led to some confusion.

== Childhood ==
Issai Schur was born into a Jewish family, the son of the businessman Moses Schur and his wife Golde Schur (née Landau). He was born in Mogilev on the Dnieper River, the capital of Mogilev Governorate of the Russian Empire (present-day Belarus). Schur used the name Schaia (Isaiah as the epitaph on his grave) rather than Issai up in his middle twenties. Schur's father may have been a wholesale merchant.

In 1888, at the age of 13, Schur went to Liepāja in Courland (present-day Latvia), where his married sister and his brother lived, 640 km north-west of Mogilev. Courland was one of the three Baltic governorates of the Russian Empire, and since the Middle Ages, the Baltic Germans were the upper social class. The local Jewish community spoke mostly German and not Yiddish.

Schur attended the German-speaking Nicolai Gymnasium in Libau from 1888 to 1894 and reached the top grade in his final examination, and received a gold medal. Here he became fluent in German.

== Education ==
In October 1894, Schur attended the University of Berlin, with concentration in mathematics and physics. In 1901, he graduated summa cum laude under Frobenius and Lazarus Immanuel Fuchs with his dissertation On a class of matrices that can be assigned to a given matrix, which contains a general theory of the representation of linear groups. According to Vogt, he began to use the name Issai at this time. Schur thought that his chance of success in the Russian Empire was rather poor, and because he spoke German perfectly, he remained in Berlin. He graduated in 1903 and was a lecturer at the University of Berlin. Schur held a position as professor at the Berlin University for the ten years from 1903 to 1913.

In 1913, he accepted an appointment as associate professor and successor of Felix Hausdorff at the University of Bonn. In the following years Frobenius tried various ways to get Schur back to Berlin. Among other things, Schur's name was mentioned in a letter dated 27 June 1913 from Frobenius to Robert Gnehm (the School Board President of the ETH) as a possible successor to Carl Friedrich Geiser. Frobenius complained that they had never followed his advice before and then said: "That is why I can't even recommend Prof. J. Schur (now in Bonn) to you. He's too good for Zurich, and should be my successor in Berlin". Hermann Weyl got the job in Zurich. The efforts of Frobenius were finally successful in 1916, when Schur succeeded Johannes Knoblauch as adjunct professor. Frobenius died a year later, on 3 August 1917. Schur and Carathéodory were both named as the frontrunners for his successor. But they chose Constantin Carathéodory in the end. In 1919, Schur finally received a personal professorship, and in 1921, he took over the chair of the retired Friedrich Hermann Schottky. In 1922, he was also added to the Prussian Academy of Sciences.

== During the time of Nazism ==
After the takeover by the Nazis and the elimination of the parliamentary opposition, the Law for the Restoration of the Professional Civil Service on 7 April 1933, prescribed the release of all distinguished public servants that held unpopular political opinions or who were "Jewish" in origin; a subsequent regulation extended this to professors and therefore also to Schur. Schur was suspended and excluded from the university system. His colleague Erhard Schmidt fought for his reinstatement, and since Schur had been a Prussian official before the First World War, he was allowed to participate in certain special lectures on teaching in the winter semester of 1933/1934 again. Schur withdrew his application for leave from the Science Minister and passed up the offer of a visiting professorship at the University of Wisconsin–Madison for the academic year 1933–34. One element that likely played a role in the rejection of the offer was that Schur no longer felt he could cope with the requirements that would have come with a new beginning in an English-speaking environment.

Already in 1932, Schur's daughter Hilde had married the doctor Chaim Abelin in Bern. As a result, Issai Schur visited his daughter in Bern several times. In Zurich he met often with George Pólya, with whom he was on friendly terms since before the First World War.

On such a trip to Switzerland in the summer of 1935, a letter reached Schur from Ludwig Bieberbach signed on behalf of the Rector's, stating that Schur should urgently seek him out in the University of Berlin. They needed to discuss an important matter with him. It involved Schur's dismissal on 30 September 1935.

Schur remained a member of the Prussian Academy of Sciences after his release as a professor, but a little later he lost this last remnant of his official position. Due to an intervention from Bieberbach in the spring of 1938 he was forced to explain his resignation from the commission of the Academy. His membership in the Advisory Board of Mathematische Zeitschrift was ended in early 1939.

== Emigration ==
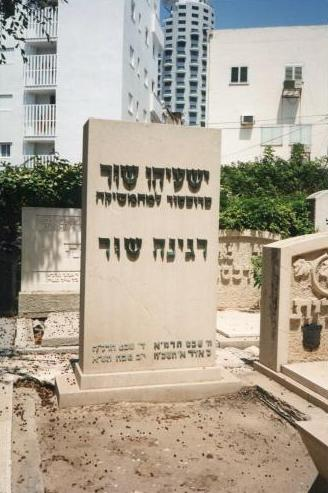
Schur's grave at Trumpeldor Cemetery

Schur found himself lonely after the flight of many of his students and the expulsion of renowned scientists from his previous place of work. Only Dr. Helmut Grunsky had been friendly to him, as Schur reported in the late thirties to his expatriate student Max Menachem Schiffer. The Gestapo was everywhere. Since Schur had announced to his wife his intentions to commit suicide in case of a summons to the Gestapo, in the summer of 1938 his wife took his letters, and with them a summons from the Gestapo, sent Issai Schur to a relaxing stay in a home outside of Berlin and went with medical certificate allowing her to meet the Gestapo in place of her husband. There they flatly asked why they were still staying in Germany. But there were economic obstacles to the planned emigration: emigrating Germans had a pre-departure Reich Flight Tax to pay, which was a quarter of their assets. Now Schur's wife had inherited a mortgage on a house in Lithuania, which because of the Lithuanian foreign exchange determination could not be repaid. On the other hand, Schur was forbidden to default or leave the mortgage to the German Reich. Thus the Schurs lacked cash and cash equivalents. Finally, the missing sum of money was somehow supplied, and to this day it does not seem to be clear who were the donors.

Schur was able to leave Germany in early 1939. His health, however, was already severely compromised. He traveled in the company of a nurse to his daughter in Bern, where his wife also followed a few days later. There they remained for several weeks and then emigrated to Palestine. Two years later, on his 66th birthday, on 10 January 1941, he died in Tel Aviv of a heart attack.

== Work ==
Schur continued the work of his teacher Frobenius with many important works for group theory and representation theory. In addition, he published important results and elegant proofs of known results in almost all branches of classical algebra and number theory. His collected works are proof of this. There, his work on the theory of integral equations and infinite series can be found.

=== Linear groups ===
In his doctoral thesis Über eine Klasse von Matrizen, die sich einer gegebenen Matrix zuordnen lassen Issai Schur determined the polynomial representations of the general linear group $GL(n, \mathbb{C})$ on the field $\mathbb{C}$ of complex numbers. The results and methods of this work are still relevant today. In his book, J.A. Green determined the polynomial representations of $GL (n, \mathbb{K})$ over infinite fields $\mathbb{K}$ with arbitrary characteristic. It is mainly based on Schur's dissertation. Green writes, "This remarkable work (of Schur) contained many very original ideas, developed with superb algebraic skill. Schur showed that these (polynomial) representations are completely reducible, that each irreducible one is "homogeneous" of some degree $r \geq 0$, and that the equivalence types of irreducible polynomial representations of $GL_n(\mathbb{C})$, of fixed homogeneous degree $r$, are in one-one correspondence with the partitions $\lambda = (\lambda_1, \ldots, \lambda_n)$ of $r$ into not more than $n$ parts. Moreover Schur showed that the character of an irreducible representation of type $\lambda$ is given by a certain symmetric function ${\underline{S}}_{\lambda}$ in $n$ variables (since described as a "Schur function")." According to Green, the methods of Schur's dissertation today are important for the theory of algebraic groups.

In 1927 Schur, in his work On the rational representations of the general linear group, gave new proofs for the main results of his dissertation. If $V$ is the natural $n$-dimensional $\mathbb{C}$ vector space on which $GL(n, \mathbb{C})$ operates, and if $r$ is a natural number, then the $r$-fold tensor product $V^{\otimes r}$ over $\mathbb{C}$ is a $GL(n, \mathbb {C})$-module, on which the symmetric group $S_r$ of degree $r$ also operates by permutation of the tensor factors of each generator $v_1 \otimes \ldots \otimes v_r$ of $V^{\otimes r}$. By exploiting these $S_r - GL(n, \mathbb{C})$-bimodule actions on $V^{\otimes r}$, Schur manages to find elegant proofs of his sentences. This work of Schur was once very well known.

=== Professorship in Berlin ===
In Berlin, Schur was a respected member of the academic world. As a leading mathematician and a successful teacher, he held a chair at the University of Berlin for 16 years. Until 1933, his research group had an excellent reputation. His faculty worked with representation theory, which was extended by his students (including solvable groups, combinatorics, and matrix theory). Schur made fundamental contributions to algebra and group theory which, according to Hermann Weyl, were comparable in scope and depth to those of Emmy Noether (1882–1935).

When Schur's lectures were canceled in 1933, there was an outcry among the students and professors who appreciated him and liked him. By the efforts of his colleague Erhard Schmidt Schur was allowed to continue lecturing until the end of September 1935. Schur was the last Jewish professor who lost his job.

=== Zurich lecture ===
In Switzerland, Schur's colleagues Heinz Hopf and George Pólya were informed of the dismissal of Schur in 1935. They tried to help as best they could. On behalf of the Mathematical Seminars chief Michel Plancherel, on 12 December 1935 the school board president Arthur Rohn invited Schur to une série de conférences sur la théorie de la représentation des groupes finis. At the same time he asked that the formal invitation should come from President Rohn, comme le prof. Schur doit obtenir l'autorisation du ministère compétent de donner ces conférences. George Pólya arranged from this invitation of the Mathematical Seminars the Conference of the Department of Mathematics and Physics on 16 December. Meanwhile, on 14 December the official invitation letter from President Rohn had already been dispatched to Schur. Schur was promised for his guest lecture a fee of CHF 500.

Schur did not reply until 28 January 1936, on which day he was first in the possession of the required approval of the local authority. He declared himself willing to accept the invitation. He envisaged beginning the lecture on 4 February. Schur spent most of the month of February in Switzerland. Before his return to Germany he visited his daughter in Bern for a few days, and on 27 February he returned via Karlsruhe, where his sister lived, to Berlin. In a letter to Pólya from Berne, he concludes with the words: From Switzerland I take farewell with a heavy heart.

In Berlin, meanwhile, mathematician and Nazi Ludwig Bieberbach, in a letter dated 20 February 1936, informed the Reich Minister for Science, Art, and Education on the journey of Schur, and announced that he wanted to find out what was the content of the lecture in Zurich.

== Significant students ==
Schur had 26 graduate students, some of whom acquired a mathematical reputation. Among them are

- Alfred Brauer, University of Berlin (1928)
- Richard Brauer, University of Berlin (1925)
- Karl Dörge, University of Berlin (1925)
- Bernhard Neumann, University of Berlin, Cambridge University (1932, 1935)
- Félix Pollaczek, University of Berlin (1922)
- Heinz Pruefer, University of Berlin, (1921)
- Richard Rado, University of Berlin, Cambridge University (1933, 1935)
- Isaac Jacob Schoenberg, Alexandru Ioan Cuza University of Iaşi (1926)
- Wilhelm Specht, University of Berlin (1932)
- Helmut Wielandt, University of Berlin (1935)

== Legacy ==
=== Concepts named after Schur ===
Among others, the following concepts are named after Issai Schur:

- Schur algebra
- Schur complement
- Schur index
- Schur indicator
- Schur multiplier
- Schur orthogonality relations
- Schur polynomial
- Schur product
- Schur test
- Schur's inequality
- Schur's theorem
- Schur-convex function
- Schur–Weyl duality
- Lehmer–Schur algorithm
- Schur's property for normed spaces.
- Jordan–Schur theorem
- Schur–Zassenhaus theorem
- Schur triple
- Schur decomposition
- Schur's lower bound

=== Quotes ===
In his commemorative speech, Alfred Brauer (PhD candidate of Schur) spoke about Issai Schur as follows: As a teacher, Schur was excellent. His lectures were very clear, but not always easy and required cooperation – During the winter semester of 1930, the number of students who wanted to attend Schur's theory of numbers lecture, was such that the second largest university lecture hall with about 500 seats was too small. His most human characteristics were probably his great modesty, his helpfulness and his human interest in his students.

Heinz Hopf, who had been in Berlin before his appointment to Zurich at the ETH Privatdozent, held – as is clear from oral statements and also from letters – Issai Schur as a mathematician and greatly appreciated man. Here, this appreciation was based entirely on reciprocity: in a letter of 1930 to George Pólya on the occasion of the re-appointment of Hermann Weyl, Schur says of Hopf: Hopf is a very excellent teacher, a mathematician of strong temperament and strong effect, a master's discipline, trained excellent in other areas. – If I have to characterize him as a man, it may suffice if I say that I sincerely look forward to each time I meet with him.

Schur was, however, known for putting a correct distance in personal affairs. The testimony of Hopf is in accordance with statements of Schur's former students in Berlin, by Walter Ledermann and Bernhard Neumann.

== Publications ==
- Schur, Issai (1968), Grunsky, Helmut (ed.), Vorlesungen über Invariantentheorie, Die Grundlehren der mathematischen Wissenschaften, vol. 143, Berlin, New York: Springer-Verlag, ISBN 9780387041391, MR 0229674
- Schur, Issai (1973), Brauer, Alfred; Rohrbach, Hans (eds.), Gesammelte Abhandlungen, Berlin, New York: Springer-Verlag, ISBN 978-3-540-05630-0, MR 0462891
