= Schur's lemma (Riemannian geometry) =

Whenever certain curvatures are pointwise constant then they must be globally constant

In Riemannian geometry, Schur's lemma is a result that says, heuristically, whenever certain curvatures are pointwise constant then they are forced to be globally constant. The proof is essentially a one-step calculation, which has only one input: the second Bianchi identity.

== The Schur lemma for the Ricci tensor ==
Suppose $(M, g)$ is a smooth Riemannian manifold with dimension $n.$ Recall that this defines for each element $p$ of $M$:

- the sectional curvature, which assigns to every 2-dimensional linear subspace $V$ of $T_p M,$ a real number $\operatorname{sec}_p(V)$
- the Riemann curvature tensor, which is a multilinear map $\operatorname{Rm}_p : T_p M \times T_p M \times T_p M \times T_p M \to \R$
- the Ricci curvature, which is a symmetric bilinear map $\operatorname{Ric}_p : T_p M \times T_p M \to \R$
- the scalar curvature, which is a real number $\operatorname{R}_p$

The Schur lemma states the following:

Suppose that $n$ is not equal to two. If there is a function $\kappa$ on $M$ such that $\operatorname{Ric}_p = \kappa(p) g_p$ for all $p \in M$ then $d \kappa(p) = 0.$ Equivalently, $\kappa$ is constant on each connected component of $M$; this could also be phrased as asserting that each connected component of $M$ is an Einstein manifold.

The Schur lemma is a simple consequence of the "twice-contracted second Bianchi identity," which states that
$$\operatorname{div}_g\operatorname{Ric} = \frac{1}{2}dR.$$
understood as an equality of smooth 1-forms on $M.$ Substituting in the given condition $\operatorname{Ric}_p = \kappa(p) g_p,$ one finds that $\textstyle d\kappa = \frac{n}{2} d\kappa.$

=== Alternative formulations of the assumptions ===
Let $B$ be a symmetric bilinear form on an $n$-dimensional inner product space $(V, g).$ Then
$$|B|_g^2 = \left|B-\frac{1}{n}\left(\operatorname{tr}^gB\right)g\right|_g^2 + \frac{1}{n}\left(\operatorname{tr}^gB\right)^2.$$
Additionally, note that if $B = \kappa g$ for some number $\kappa,$ then one automatically has $\kappa = \frac{1}{n} \operatorname{tr}^g B.${ With these observations in mind, one can restate the Schur lemma in the following form:

Let $(M, g)$ be a connected smooth Riemannian manifold whose dimension is not equal to two. Then the following are equivalent:

- There is a function $\kappa$ on $M$ such that $\operatorname{Ric}_p = \kappa(p) g_p$ for all $p \in M$
- There is a number $\kappa$ such that $\operatorname{Ric}_p = \kappa g_p$ for all $p \in M,$ that is, $(M, g)$ is Einstein
- One has $\operatorname{Ric}_p = \frac{1}{n} R_p g_p$ for all $p \in M,$ that is, the traceless Ricci tensor is zero
- $|\operatorname{Ric}|_g^2=\textstyle\frac{1}{n}R^2$
- $|\operatorname{Ric}|_g^2\leq\textstyle\frac{1}{n}R^2.$

If $(M, g)$ is a connected smooth pseudo-Riemannian manifold, then the first three conditions are equivalent, and they imply the fourth condition.

Note that the dimensional restriction is important, since every two-dimensional Riemannian manifold which does not have constant curvature would be a counterexample.

== The Schur lemma for the Riemann tensor ==
The following is an immediate corollary of the Schur lemma for the Ricci tensor.

Let $(M, g)$ be a connected smooth Riemannian manifold whose dimension $n$ is not equal to two. Then the following are equivalent:

- There is a function $\kappa$ on $M$ such that $\operatorname{sec}_p(V) = \kappa(p)$ for all $p \in M$ and all two-dimensional linear subspaces $V$ of $T_p M,$
- There is a number $\kappa$ such that $\operatorname{sec}_p(V) = \kappa$ for all $p \in M$ and all two-dimensional linear subspaces $V$ of $T_p M,$ that is, $(M, g)$ has constant curvature
- $\operatorname{sec}_p(V) = \frac{1}{n(n-1)} R_p$ for all $p \in M$ and all two-dimensional linear subspaces $V$ of $T_p M,$
- $|\operatorname{Rm}_p|^2_g = \textstyle\frac{2}{n(n-1)} R_p^2$ for all $p \in M$
- the sum of the Weyl curvature and semi-traceless part of the Riemann tensor is zero
- both the Weyl curvature and the semi-traceless part of the Riemann tensor are zero

== The Schur lemma for Codazzi tensors ==
Let $(M, g)$ be a smooth Riemannian or pseudo-Riemannian manifold of dimension $n.$ Let $h$ he a smooth symmetric (0,2)-tensor field whose covariant derivative, with respect to the Levi-Civita connection, is completely symmetric. The symmetry condition is an analogue of the Bianchi identity; continuing the analogy, one takes a trace to find that
$$\operatorname{div}^gh = d\big(\operatorname{tr}^gh\big).$$
If there is a function $\kappa$ on $M$ such that $h_p = \kappa(p)g_p$ for all $p$ in $M,$ then upon substitution one finds
$$d\kappa=n\cdot d\kappa.$$
Hence $n > 1$ implies that $\kappa$ is constant on each connected component of $M.$ As above, one can then state the Schur lemma in this context:

Let $(M, g)$ be a connected smooth Riemannian manifold whose dimension is not equal to one. Let $h$ be a smooth symmetric (0,2)-tensor field whose covariant derivative is totally symmetric as a (0,3)-tensor field. Then the following are equivalent:

- there is a function $\kappa$ on $M$ such that $h_p = \kappa(p) g_p$ for all $p \in M,$
- there is a number $\kappa$ such that $h_p = \kappa g_p$ for all $p \in M,$
- $h_p = \frac{1}{n}\left(\operatorname{tr}^g h_p\right) g_p$ for all $p \in M,$ that is, the traceless form of $h$ is zero
- $|h_p|_g^2=\textstyle\frac{1}{n}(\operatorname{tr}^gh_p)^2$ for all $p \in M$
- $|h_p|_g^2\leq\textstyle\frac{1}{n}(\operatorname{tr}^gh_p)^2$ for all $p \in M$

If $(M, g)$ is a connected and smooth pseudo-Riemannian manifold, then the first three are equivalent, and imply the fourth and fifth.

== Applications ==
The Schur lemmas are frequently employed to prove roundness of geometric objects. A noteworthy example is to characterize the limits of convergent geometric flows.

For example, a key part of Richard Hamilton's 1982 breakthrough on the Ricci flow was his "pinching estimate" which, informally stated, says that for a Riemannian metric which appears in a 3-manifold Ricci flow with positive Ricci curvature, the eigenvalues of the Ricci tensor are close to one another relative to the size of their sum. If one normalizes the sum, then, the eigenvalues are close to one another in an absolute sense. In this sense, each of the metrics appearing in a 3-manifold Ricci flow of positive Ricci curvature "approximately" satisfies the conditions of the Schur lemma. The Schur lemma itself is not explicitly applied, but its proof is effectively carried out through Hamilton's calculations.

In the same way, the Schur lemma for the Riemann tensor is employed to study convergence of Ricci flow in higher dimensions. This goes back to Gerhard Huisken's extension of Hamilton's work to higher dimensions, where the main part of the work is that the Weyl tensor and the semi-traceless Riemann tensor become zero in the long-time limit. This extends to the more general Ricci flow convergence theorems, some expositions of which directly use the Schur lemma. This includes the proof of the differentiable sphere theorem.

The Schur lemma for Codazzi tensors is employed directly in Huisken's foundational paper on convergence of mean curvature flow, which was modeled on Hamilton's work. In the final two sentences of Huisken's paper, it is concluded that one has a smooth embedding $S^n \to \R^{n+1}$ with
$$|h|^2=\frac{1}{n}H^2,$$
where $h$ is the second fundamental form and $H$ is the mean curvature. The Schur lemma implies that the mean curvature is constant, and the image of this embedding then must be a standard round sphere.

Another application relates full isotropy and curvature. Suppose that $(M,g)$ is a connected thrice-differentiable Riemannian manifold, and that for each $p\in M$ the group of isometries $\operatorname{Isom}(M,g)$ acts transitively on $T_pM.$ This means that for all $p\in M$ and all $v,w\in T_pM$ there is an isometry $\varphi:(M,g)\to(M,g)$ such that $\varphi(p)=p$ and $d\varphi_p(v)=w.$ This implies that $\operatorname{Isom}(M,g)$ also acts transitively on $\text{Gr}(2,T_pM),$ that is, for every $P,Q\in\text{Gr}(2,T_pM)$ there is an isometry $\varphi:(M,g)\to(M,g)$ such that $\varphi(p)=p$ and $d\varphi_p(P)=Q.$ Since isometries preserve sectional curvature, this implies that $\operatorname{sec}_p$ is constant for each $p\in M.$ The Schur lemma implies that $(M,g)$ has constant curvature. A particularly notable application of this is that any spacetime which models the cosmological principle must be the warped product of an interval and a constant-curvature Riemannian manifold. See O'Neill (1983, page 341).

== Stability ==
Recent research has investigated the case that the conditions of the Schur lemma are only approximately satisfied.

Consider the Schur lemma in the form "If the traceless Ricci tensor is zero then the scalar curvature is constant." Camillo De Lellis and Peter Topping have shown that if the traceless Ricci tensor is approximately zero then the scalar curvature is approximately constant. Precisely:

- Suppose $(M,g)$ is a closed Riemannian manifold with nonnegative Ricci curvature and dimension $n\geq 3.$ Then, where $\overline{R}$ denotes the average value of the scalar curvature, one has
  $$\int_M (R-\overline{R})^2\,d\mu_g\leq\frac{4n(n-1)}{(n-2)^2}\int_M \Big|\operatorname{Ric}-\frac{1}{n}Rg\Big|_g^2\,d\mu_g.$$

Next, consider the Schur lemma in the special form "If $\Sigma$ is a connected embedded surface in $\R^3$ whose traceless second fundamental form is zero, then its mean curvature is constant." Camillo De Lellis and Stefan Müller have shown that if the traceless second fundamental form of a compact surface is approximately zero then the mean curvature is approximately constant. Precisely

- there is a number $C$ such that, for any smooth compact connected embedded surface $\Sigma \subseteq \R^3,$ one has
  $$\int_\Sigma (H-\overline{H})^2\,d\mu_g\leq C\int_\Sigma \Big|h-\frac{1}{2}Hg\Big|_g^2\,d\mu_g,$$
  where $h$ is the second fundamental form, $g$ is the induced metric, and $H$ is the mean curvature $\operatorname{tr}_gh.$

As an application, one can conclude that $\Sigma$ itself is 'close' to a round sphere.
