= Special unitary group =

Group of unitary complex matrices with determinant of 1

In mathematics, the special unitary group of degree n, denoted SU(n), is the Lie group of n × n unitary matrices with determinant 1.

The matrices of the more general unitary group may have complex determinants with absolute value 1, rather than real 1 in the special case.

The group operation is matrix multiplication. The special unitary group is a normal subgroup of the unitary group U(n), consisting of all n × n unitary matrices. As a compact classical group, U(n) is the group that preserves the standard inner product on $\mathbb{C}^n$. (Note: For a characterization of U(n) and hence SU(n) in terms of preservation of the standard inner product on $\mathbb{C}^n$, see Classical group.) It is itself a subgroup of the general linear group, $\operatorname{SU}(n) \subset \operatorname{U}(n) \subset \operatorname{GL}(n, \mathbb{C} ).$

The SU(n) groups find wide application in the Standard Model of particle physics, especially SU(2) in the electroweak interaction and SU(3) in quantum chromodynamics.

The simplest case, SU(1), is the trivial group, having only a single element. The group SU(2) is isomorphic to the group of quaternions of norm 1, and is thus diffeomorphic to the 3-sphere. Since unit quaternions can be used to represent rotations in 3-dimensional space (uniquely up to sign), there is a surjective homomorphism from SU(2) to the rotation group SO(3) whose kernel is {+I, −I}. (Note: For an explicit description of the homomorphism SU(2) → SO(3), see Rotation group SO(3) § Connection between SO(3) and SU(2).) Since the quaternions can be identified as the even subalgebra of the Clifford algebra Cl(3), SU(2) is identical to one of the symmetry groups of spinors, Spin(3), that enables a spinor presentation of rotations.

== Properties ==
The special unitary group SU(n) is a strictly real Lie group (vs. a more general complex Lie group). Its dimension as a real manifold is n^{2} − 1. Topologically, it is compact and simply connected. Algebraically, it is a simple Lie group (meaning its Lie algebra is simple; see below).

The center of SU(n) is isomorphic to the cyclic group $\mathbb{Z}/n\mathbb{Z}$, and is composed of the diagonal matrices ζ I for ζ an nth root of unity and I the n × n identity matrix.

Its outer automorphism group for n ≥ 3 is $\mathbb{Z}/2\mathbb{Z}$, while the outer automorphism group of SU(2) is the trivial group.

A maximal torus of rank n − 1 is given by the set of diagonal matrices with determinant 1. The Weyl group of SU(n) is the symmetric group S_{n}, which is represented by signed permutation matrices (the signs being necessary to ensure that the determinant is 1).

The Lie algebra of SU(n), denoted by $\mathfrak{su}(n)$, can be identified with the set of traceless anti‑Hermitian n × n complex matrices, with the regular commutator as a Lie bracket. Particle physicists often use a different, equivalent representation: The set of traceless Hermitian n × n complex matrices with Lie bracket given by −i times the commutator.

== Lie algebra ==
The Lie algebra $\mathfrak{su}(n)$ of SU(n) consists of n × n skew-Hermitian matrices with trace zero. This (real) Lie algebra has dimension n^{2} − 1.

The complexification of the Lie algebra $\mathfrak{su}(n)$ is $\mathfrak{sl}(n; \mathbb{C})$, the space of all n × n complex matrices with trace zero. A Cartan subalgebra then consists of the diagonal matrices with trace zero, which we identify with vectors in $\mathbb C^n$ whose entries sum to zero. The roots then consist of all the n(n − 1) permutations of (1, −1, 0, ..., 0).

A choice of simple roots is
$$\begin{align}
(&1, -1,  0, \dots, 0,  0), \\
(&0,  1, -1, \dots, 0,  0), \\
&\vdots                    \\
(&0,  0,  0, \dots, 1, -1).
\end{align}$$

So, SU(n) is of rank n − 1 and its Dynkin diagram is given by A_{n−1}, a chain of n − 1 nodes:.... Its Cartan matrix is
$$\begin{pmatrix}
2 & -1 &  0 & \dots & 0 \\
-1 &  2 & -1 & \dots & 0 \\
0 & -1 &  2 & \dots & 0 \\
\vdots & \vdots & \vdots & \ddots & \vdots \\
0 & 0 & 0 & \dots & 2
\end{pmatrix}.$$

Its Weyl group or Coxeter group is the symmetric group S_{n}, the symmetry group of the (n − 1)-simplex.

=== Fundamental representation ===
In the physics literature, it is common to identify the Lie algebra with the space of trace-zero Hermitian (rather than the skew-Hermitian) matrices. That is to say, the physicists' Lie algebra differs by a factor of $i$ from the mathematicians'. With this convention, one can then choose generators T_{a} that are traceless Hermitian complex n × n matrices, where:
$$T_a \, T_b = \tfrac{1}{\, 2n \,}\,\delta_{ab}\,I_n + \tfrac{1}{2}\,\sum_{c=1}^{n^2 -1}\left(if_{abc} + d_{abc} \right) \, T_c$$
where the f are the structure constants and are antisymmetric in all indices, while the d-coefficients are symmetric in all indices.

As a consequence, the commutator is:
$$~ \left[T_a, \, T_b\right] ~ = ~ i \sum_{c=1}^{n^2 -1} \, f_{abc} \, T_c \;,$$
and the corresponding anticommutator is:
$$\left\{T_a, \, T_b\right\} ~ = ~ \tfrac{1}{n} \, \delta_{ab} \, I_n + \sum_{c=1}^{n^2 -1}{d_{abc} \, T_c} ~.$$

The factor of i in the commutation relation arises from the physics convention and is not present when using the mathematicians' convention.

The conventional normalization condition is
$$\sum_{c,e=1}^{n^2 - 1} d_{ace}\,d_{bce} = \frac{\, n^2 - 4 \,}{n} \, \delta_{ab}~ .$$

The generators satisfy the Jacobi identity:
$$[T_a,[T_b,T_c]]+[T_b,[T_c,T_a]]+[T_c,[T_a,T_b]]=0.$$

By convention, in the physics literature the generators $T_a$ are defined as the traceless Hermitian complex matrices with a 1/2 factor: for SU(2), the generators are chosen as $\tfrac{1}{2} \sigma_1$, $\tfrac{1}{2} \sigma_2$, $\tfrac{1}{2} \sigma_3$ where $\sigma_a$ are the Pauli matrices, while for the case of SU(3) one defines $T_a = \tfrac{1}{2} \lambda_a$ where $\lambda_a$ are the Gell-Mann matrices. With these definitions, the generators satisfy the following normalization condition:
$$Tr(T_a T_b) = \frac{1}{2} \delta_{ab}.$$

=== Adjoint representation ===
In the (n^{2} − 1)-dimensional adjoint representation, the generators are represented by (n^{2} − 1) × (n^{2} − 1) matrices, whose elements are defined by the structure constants themselves:
$$\left(T_a\right)_{jk} = -if_{ajk}.$$

== SU(2) ==
Using matrix multiplication for the binary operation, SU(2) forms a group,
$$\operatorname{SU}(2) = \left\{ \begin{pmatrix} \alpha & -\overline{\beta} \\ \beta & \overline{\alpha} \end{pmatrix}: \ \ \alpha,\beta \in \mathbb{C}, |\alpha|^2 + |\beta|^2 = 1 \right\}~,$$
where the overline denotes complex conjugation.

=== Diffeomorphism with the 3-sphere S^{3} ===
If we consider $\alpha,\beta$ as a pair in $\mathbb{C}^2$ where $\alpha=a+bi$ and $\beta=c+di$ with real numbers $a,b,c,d$, then the equation $|\alpha|^2 + |\beta|^2 = 1$ becomes
$$a^2 + b^2 + c^2 + d^2 = 1.$$

This is the equation of the 3-sphere S^{3}. This can also be seen using an embedding: the map
$$\begin{align}
\varphi \colon \mathbb{C}^2 \to{} &\operatorname{M}(2, \mathbb{C}) \\[5pt]
\varphi(\alpha, \beta) ={} &\begin{pmatrix} \alpha & -\overline{\beta}\\ \beta & \overline{\alpha}\end{pmatrix},
\end{align}$$
where $\operatorname{M}(2,\mathbb{C})$ denotes the set of 2-by-2 complex matrices, is an injective real linear map (by considering $\mathbb{C}^2$ isomorphic to $\mathbb{R}^4$ and $\operatorname{M}(2,\mathbb{C})$ isomorphic to $\mathbb{R}^8$). Hence, the restriction of φ to the 3-sphere S^{3} is an embedding of the 3-sphere onto a compact submanifold of $\operatorname{M}(2,\mathbb{C})$, namely φ(S^{3}) = SU(2).

Therefore, as a manifold, S^{3} is diffeomorphic to SU(2), which shows that SU(2) is simply connected and that S^{3} can be endowed with the structure of a compact, connected Lie group.

=== Isomorphism with group of versors and relation to spatial rotations ===
The ring of quaternions can be associated with a subring of 2-by-2 complex matrices by the ring isomorphism mapping
$$a\,\hat{1} + b\,\hat{i} + c\,\hat{j} + d\,\hat{k}$$
to
$$\begin{pmatrix}
a + bi & c + di \\
-c + di &  a - bi
\end{pmatrix} \quad
(a, b, c, d \in \mathbb{R}).$$
Additionally, the determinant of the matrix is the squared norm of the corresponding quaternion. Clearly any matrix in SU(2) is of this form and, since it has determinant 1, the corresponding quaternion has norm 1. Thus, restricting the above map gives a group isomorphism between SU(2) and the group of quaternions with norm 1.

Quaternions of norm 1 are called versors since they can be associated with rotations in 3-dimensional space: Every versor is naturally associated to a spatial rotation in 3 dimensions, and the product of versors is associated to the composition of the associated rotations. Furthermore, every rotation arises from exactly two versors in this fashion. In short: there is a 2:1 surjective homomorphism from SU(2) to the rotation group SO(3); consequently SO(3) is isomorphic to the quotient group SU(2)/{±I}, the manifold underlying SO(3) is obtained by identifying antipodal points of the 3-sphere S^{3}, and SU(2) is the universal cover of SO(3).

=== Lie algebra ===
The Lie algebra of SU(2) consists of 2 × 2 skew-Hermitian matrices with trace zero. Explicitly, this means
$$\mathfrak{su}(2) = \left\{ \begin{pmatrix} i\ a & -\overline{z} \\ z & -i\ a \end{pmatrix}:\ a \in \mathbb{R}, z \in \mathbb{C} \right\}~.$$

The Lie algebra is then generated by the following matrices,
$$u_1 = \begin{pmatrix}
0 & i \\
i & 0
\end{pmatrix}, \quad
u_2 = \begin{pmatrix}
0 & -1 \\
1 &  0
\end{pmatrix}, \quad
u_3 = \begin{pmatrix}
i &  0 \\
0 & -i
\end{pmatrix}~,$$
which have the form of the general element specified above.

This can also be written as $\mathfrak{s u}(2)=\operatorname{span}\left\{i \sigma_{1}, i \sigma_{2}, i \sigma_{3}\right\}$ using the Pauli matrices.

These satisfy the quaternion relationships $u_2 u_3 = -u_3 u_2 = u_1$, $u_3 u_1 = -u_1 u_3 = u_2$, and $u_1 u_2 = -u_2 u_1 = u_3$. The commutator bracket is therefore specified by
$$\left[u_3, u_1\right] = 2\ u_2, \quad \left[u_1, u_2\right] = 2\ u_3, \quad \left[u_2, u_3\right] = 2\ u_1~.$$

The above generators are related to the Pauli matrices by $u_1 = i\ \sigma_1, u_2 = -i\ \sigma_2$ and $u_3 = i\ \sigma_3$. This representation is routinely used in quantum mechanics to represent the spin of fundamental particles such as electrons. They also serve as unit vectors for the description of our 3 spatial dimensions in loop quantum gravity. They also correspond to the Pauli X, Y, and Z gates, which are standard generators for the single qubit gates, corresponding to 3D rotations about the axes of the Bloch sphere.

The Lie algebra serves to work out the representations of SU(2).

== SU(3) ==
The group SU(3) is an 8-dimensional simple Lie group consisting of all 3 × 3 unitary matrices with determinant 1.

=== Topology ===
The group SU(3) is a simply-connected, compact Lie group. Its topological structure can be understood by noting that SU(3) acts transitively on the unit sphere $S^5$ in $\mathbb{C}^3 \cong \mathbb{R}^6$. The stabilizer of an arbitrary point in the sphere is isomorphic to SU(2), which topologically is a 3-sphere. It then follows that SU(3) is a fiber bundle over the base S^{5} with fiber S^{3}. Since the fibers and the base are simply connected, the simple connectedness of SU(3) then follows by means of a standard topological result (the long exact sequence of homotopy groups for fiber bundles).

The SU(2)-bundles over S^{5} are classified by $\pi_4\mathord\left(S^3\right) = \mathbb{Z}_2$ since any such bundle can be constructed by looking at trivial bundles on the two hemispheres $S^5_\text{N}, S^5_\text{S}$ and looking at the transition function on their intersection, which is a copy of S^{4}, so
$$S^5_\text{N} \cap S^5_\text{S} \simeq S^4$$

Then, all such transition functions are classified by homotopy classes of maps
$$\left[S^4, \mathrm{SU}(2)\right] \cong \left[S^4, S^3\right] = \pi_4\mathord\left(S^3\right) \cong \mathbb{Z}/2$$
and as $\pi_4(\mathrm{SU}(3)) = \{0\}$ rather than $\Z/2\Z$, SU(3) cannot be the trivial bundle SU(2) × S^{5} ≅ S^{3} × S^{5}, and therefore must be the unique nontrivial (twisted) bundle. This can be shown by looking at the induced long exact sequence on homotopy groups.

=== Representation theory ===
The representation theory of SU(3) is well-understood. Descriptions of these representations, from the point of view of its complexified Lie algebra $\mathfrak{sl}(3; \mathbb{C})$, may be found in the articles on Lie algebra representations or the Clebsch–Gordan coefficients for SU(3).

=== Lie algebra ===
The generators, T, of the Lie algebra $\mathfrak{su}(3)$ of SU(3) in the defining (particle physics, Hermitian) representation, are
$$T_a = \frac{\lambda_a}{2}~,$$
where λ_{a}, the Gell-Mann matrices, are the SU(3) analog of the Pauli matrices for SU(2):
$$\begin{align}
\lambda_1 ={} &\begin{pmatrix} 0 &  1 &  0 \\ 1 &  0 &  0 \\ 0 & 0 &  0 \end{pmatrix}, &
\lambda_2 ={} &\begin{pmatrix} 0 & -i &  0 \\ i &  0 &  0 \\ 0 & 0 &  0 \end{pmatrix}, &
\lambda_3 ={} &\begin{pmatrix} 1 &  0 &  0 \\ 0 & -1 &  0 \\ 0 & 0 &  0 \end{pmatrix}, \\[6pt]
\lambda_4 ={} &\begin{pmatrix} 0 &  0 &  1 \\ 0 &  0 &  0 \\ 1 & 0 &  0 \end{pmatrix}, &
\lambda_5 ={} &\begin{pmatrix} 0 &  0 & -i \\ 0 &  0 &  0 \\ i & 0 &  0 \end{pmatrix}, \\[6pt]
\lambda_6 ={} &\begin{pmatrix} 0 &  0 &  0 \\ 0 &  0 &  1 \\ 0 & 1 &  0 \end{pmatrix}, &
\lambda_7 ={} &\begin{pmatrix} 0 &  0 &  0 \\ 0 &  0 & -i \\ 0 & i &  0 \end{pmatrix}, &
\lambda_8 = \frac{1}{\sqrt{3}}
&\begin{pmatrix} 1 &  0 &  0 \\ 0 &  1 &  0 \\ 0 & 0 & -2 \end{pmatrix}.
\end{align}$$

These λ_{a} span all traceless Hermitian matrices H of the Lie algebra, as required. Note that λ_{2}, λ_{5}, λ_{7} are antisymmetric.

They obey the relations
$$\begin{align}
\left[T_a, T_b\right] &= i \sum_{c=1}^8 f_{abc} T_c, \\
\left\{T_a, T_b\right\} &= \frac{1}{3} \delta_{ab} I_3 + \sum_{c=1}^8 d_{abc} T_c,
\end{align}$$
or, equivalently,
$$\begin{align}
\left[\lambda_a, \lambda_b\right] &= 2i \sum_{c=1}^8 f_{abc} \lambda_c, \\
\{\lambda_a, \lambda_b\} &= \frac{4}{3}\delta_{ab} I_3 + 2\sum_{c=1}^8{d_{abc} \lambda_c}.
\end{align}$$

The f are the structure constants of the Lie algebra, given by
$$\begin{align}
f_{123} &= 1, \\
f_{147} = -f_{156} = f_{246} = f_{257} = f_{345} = -f_{367} &= \frac{1}{2}, \\
f_{458} =  f_{678} &= \frac{\sqrt{3}}{2},
\end{align}$$
while all other f_{abc} not related to these by permutation are zero. In general, they vanish unless they contain an odd number of indices from the set {2, 5, 7}. (Note: So fewer than 1/6 of all of the f_{abc} are non-vanishing.)

The symmetric coefficients d take the values
$$\begin{align}
d_{118} = d_{228} = d_{338} = -d_{888} &=  \frac{1}{\sqrt{3}} \\
d_{448} = d_{558} = d_{668} =  d_{778} &= -\frac{1}{2\sqrt{3}} \\
d_{344} = d_{355} = -d_{366} = -d_{377} = -d_{247} = d_{146} = d_{157} =  d_{256} &=  \frac{1}{2} ~.
\end{align}$$

They vanish if the number of indices from the set {2, 5, 7} is odd.

A generic SU(3) group element generated by a traceless 3 × 3 Hermitian matrix H, normalized as tr(H^{2}) = 2, can be expressed as a second order matrix polynomial in H:
$$\begin{align}
\exp(i\theta H) ={}
&\left[-\frac{1}{3} I\sin\left(\varphi + \frac{2\pi}{3}\right) \sin\left(\varphi - \frac{2\pi}{3}\right) - \frac{1}{2\sqrt{3}}~H\sin(\varphi) - \frac{1}{4}~H^2\right]
\frac{\exp\left(\frac{2}{\sqrt{3}}~i\theta\sin(\varphi)\right)}
{\cos\left(\varphi + \frac{2\pi}{3}\right) \cos\left(\varphi - \frac{2\pi}{3}\right)} \\[6pt]
& {} + \left[-\frac{1}{3}~I\sin(\varphi) \sin\left(\varphi - \frac{2\pi}{3}\right) - \frac{1}{2\sqrt{3}}~H\sin\left(\varphi + \frac{2\pi}{3}\right) - \frac{1}{4}~H^{2}\right]
\frac{\exp\left(\frac{2}{\sqrt{3}}~i\theta \sin\left(\varphi + \frac{2\pi}{3}\right)\right)}
{\cos(\varphi) \cos\left(\varphi - \frac{2\pi}{3}\right)} \\[6pt]
& {} + \left[-\frac{1}{3}~I\sin(\varphi) \sin\left(\varphi + \frac{2\pi}{3}\right) - \frac{1}{2\sqrt{3}}~H \sin\left(\varphi - \frac{2\pi}{3}\right) - \frac{1}{4}~H^2\right]
\frac{\exp\left(\frac{2}{\sqrt{3}}~i\theta \sin\left(\varphi - \frac{2\pi}{3}\right)\right)}
{\cos(\varphi)\cos\left(\varphi + \frac{2\pi}{3}\right)}
\end{align}$$
where
$$\varphi \equiv \frac{1}{3}\left[\arccos\left(\frac{3\sqrt{3}}{2}\det H\right) - \frac{\pi}{2}\right].$$

== Important subgroups ==
In physics the special unitary group is used to represent fermionic symmetries. In theories of symmetry breaking it is important to be able to find the subgroups of the special unitary group. Subgroups of SU(n) that are important in GUT physics are, for p > 1, n − p > 1,
$$\operatorname{SU}(n) \supset \operatorname{SU}(p) \times \operatorname{SU}(n - p) \times \operatorname{U}(1),$$
where × denotes the direct product and U(1), known as the circle group, is the multiplicative group of all complex numbers with absolute value 1.

For completeness, there are also the orthogonal and symplectic subgroups,
$$\begin{align}
\operatorname{SU}(n) &\supset \operatorname{SO}(n), \\
\operatorname{SU}(2n) &\supset \operatorname{Sp}(n).
\end{align}$$

Since the rank of SU(n) is n − 1 and of U(1) is 1, a useful check is that the sum of the ranks of the subgroups is less than or equal to the rank of the original group. SU(n) is a subgroup of various other Lie groups,
$$\begin{align}
\operatorname{SO}(2n) &\supset \operatorname{SU}(n) \\
\operatorname{Sp}(n) &\supset \operatorname{SU}(n) \\
\operatorname{Spin}(4) &= \operatorname{SU}(2) \times \operatorname{SU}(2) \\
\operatorname{E}_6 &\supset \operatorname{SU}(6) \\
\operatorname{E}_7 &\supset \operatorname{SU}(8) \\
\operatorname{G}_2 &\supset \operatorname{SU}(3)
\end{align}$$
See Spin group and Simple Lie group for E_{6}, E_{7}, and G_{2}.

There are also the accidental isomorphisms: SU(4) = Spin(6), SU(2) = Spin(3) = Sp(1), (Note: Sp(n) is the compact real form of $\operatorname{Sp}(2n, \mathbb{C})$. It is sometimes denoted USp(2n). The dimension of the Sp(n)-matrices is 2n × 2n.) and U(1) = Spin(2) = SO(2).

One may finally mention that SU(2) is the double covering group of SO(3), a relation that plays an important role in the theory of rotations of 2-spinors in non-relativistic quantum mechanics.

== Generalized special unitary group ==
For a field F, the generalized special unitary group over F, SU(p, q; F), is the group of all linear transformations of determinant 1 of a vector space of rank n = p + q over F which leave invariant a nondegenerate, Hermitian form of signature (p, q). This group is often referred to as the special unitary group of signature p q over F. The field F can be replaced by a commutative ring, in which case the vector space is replaced by a free module.

Specifically, fix a Hermitian matrix A of signature p q in $\operatorname{GL}(n, \mathbb{R})$, then all
$$M \in \operatorname{SU}(p, q, \mathbb{R})$$
satisfy
$$\begin{align}
M^{*} A M &= A \\
\det M &= 1.
\end{align}$$

Often one will see the notation SU(p, q) without reference to a ring or field; in this case, the ring or field being referred to is $\mathbb C$ and this gives one of the classical Lie groups. The standard choice for A when $\operatorname{F} = \mathbb{C}$ is
$$A = \begin{bmatrix}
0 & 0       & i \\
0 & I_{n-2} & 0 \\
-i & 0       & 0
\end{bmatrix}.$$

However, there may be better choices for A for certain dimensions which exhibit more behaviour under restriction to subrings of $\mathbb C$.

=== Example ===
An important example of this type of group is the Picard modular group $\operatorname{SU}(2, 1; \mathbb{Z}[i])$ which acts (projectively) on complex hyperbolic space of dimension two, in the same way that $\operatorname{SL}(2,9;\mathbb{Z})$ acts (projectively) on real hyperbolic space of dimension two. In 2005 Gábor Francsics and Peter Lax computed an explicit fundamental domain for the action of this group on HC^{2}.

A further example is $\operatorname{SU}(1, 1; \mathbb{C})$, which is isomorphic to $\operatorname{SL}(2, \mathbb{R})$.

=== SU(1, 1) ===
$$\mathrm{SU}(1,1) = \left \{ \begin{pmatrix}u & v \\ v^* & u^* \end{pmatrix} \in M(2,\mathbb{C}): u u^* - v v^* = 1 \right \},$$
where $~u^*~$ denotes the complex conjugate of the complex number u.

This group is isomorphic to SL(2,ℝ) and Spin(2,1) where the numbers separated by a comma refer to the signature of the quadratic form preserved by the group. The expression $u u^* - v v^*$ in the definition of SU(1,1) is an Hermitian form which becomes an isotropic quadratic form when u and v are expanded with their real components.

An early appearance of this group was as the "unit sphere" of coquaternions (split-quaternions), introduced by James Cockle in 1852. Let
$$j = \begin{bmatrix} 0 & 1 \\ 1 & 0 \end{bmatrix}\,, \quad
k = \begin{bmatrix} 1 & \;~0 \\ 0 & -1 \end{bmatrix}\,, \quad
i = \begin{bmatrix} \;~0 & 1 \\ -1 & 0 \end{bmatrix}~.$$

Then
$$j\,k = \begin{bmatrix} 0 & -1 \\ 1 & \;~0 \end{bmatrix} = -i$$,
$$i\,j\,k = I_2 \equiv \begin{bmatrix} 1 & 0 \\ 0 &  1 \end{bmatrix}$$
, the 2 × 2 identity matrix, $k\,i = j$, and $i\,j = k$, and the elements i, j, and k all anticommute, as in quaternions. Also $i$ is still a square root of −I_{2} (negative of the identity matrix), whereas j^{2} = k^{2} = I_{2} are not, unlike in quaternions. For both quaternions and coquaternions, all scalar quantities are treated as implicit multiples of I_{2} and notated as 1.

The coquaternion $q = w + x\,i + y\,j + z\,k$ with scalar w, has conjugate $q = w - x\,i - y\,j - z\,k$ similar to Hamilton's quaternions. The quadratic form is $q\,q^* = w^2 + x^2 - y^2 - z^2$.

Note that the 2-sheet hyperboloid $\left\{ x i + y j + z k : x^2 - y^2 - z^2 = 1 \right\}$ corresponds to the imaginary units in the algebra so that any point p on this hyperboloid can be used as a pole of a sinusoidal wave according to Euler's formula.

The hyperboloid is stable under SU(1, 1), illustrating the isomorphism with Spin(2, 1). The variability of the pole of a wave, as noted in studies of polarization, might view elliptical polarization as an exhibit of the elliptical shape of a wave with pole $p \ne \pm i$. The Poincaré sphere model used since 1892 has been compared to a 2-sheet hyperboloid model, and the practice of SU(1, 1) interferometry has been introduced.

When an element of SU(1, 1) is interpreted as a Möbius transformation, it leaves the unit disk stable, so this group represents the motions of the Poincaré disk model of hyperbolic plane geometry. Indeed, for a point [z, 1] in the complex projective line, the action of SU(1,1) is given by
$$\bigl[\;z,\;1\;\bigr] \begin{pmatrix}u & v^* \\ v & u^* \end{pmatrix}\, = [\;u\,z + v, \, v^*\,z +u^*\;] \, = \, \left[\;\frac{uz + v}{v^*z +u^*}, \, 1 \;\right]$$
since in projective coordinates $(\;u\,z + v, \; v^*\,z +u^*\;) \thicksim \left(\;\frac{\,u\,z + v\,}{v^*\,z +u^*}, \; 1 \;\right)$.

Writing $suv + \overline{suv} = 2\,\Re\mathord\bigl(\,suv\,\bigr)$, complex number arithmetic shows
$$\bigl|u\,z + v\bigr|^2 = S + z\,z^* \quad \text{ and } \quad \bigl|v^*\,z + u^*\bigr|^2 = S + 1~,$$
where $S = v\,v^* \left(z\,z^* + 1\right) + 2\,\Re\mathord\bigl(\,uvz\,\bigr)$.

Therefore, $z\,z^* < 1 \implies \left|uz + v\right| < \left|v^*\,z + u^*\right|$ so that their ratio lies in the open disk.

== See also ==
- Generalizations of Pauli matrices
- Orthogonal group
- Projective special unitary group, PSU(n)
- Representation theory of SU(2)
