= Schur–Horn theorem =

Characterizes the diagonal of a Hermitian matrix with given eigenvalues

In mathematics, particularly linear algebra, the Schur–Horn theorem, named after Issai Schur and Alfred Horn, characterizes the diagonal of a Hermitian matrix with given eigenvalues. It has inspired investigations and substantial generalizations in the setting of symplectic geometry. A few important generalizations are Kostant's convexity theorem, Atiyah–Guillemin–Sternberg convexity theorem and Kirwan convexity theorem.

== Statement ==
Schur–Horn theorem—Let $d_1, \dots, d_N$ and $\lambda_1, \dots, \lambda_N$ be two sequences of real numbers arranged in a non-increasing order. There is a Hermitian matrix with diagonal values $d_1, \dots, d_N$ (in this order, starting with $d_1$ at the top-left) and eigenvalues $\lambda_1, \dots, \lambda_N$ if and only if
$$\sum_{i=1}^n d_i \leq \sum_{i=1}^n \lambda_i \qquad n = 1, \dots, N-1$$
and
$$\sum_{i=1}^N d_i = \sum_{i=1}^N \lambda_i.$$

The condition on the two sequences is equivalent to the majorization condition: $\vec d \preceq \vec \lambda$.

The inequalities above may alternatively be written:
$$\begin{alignat}{7}
d_1
&\;\leq\;&& \lambda_1 \\[0.3ex]
d_2 + d_1
&\;\leq&& \lambda_1 + \lambda_2 \\[0.3ex]
\vdots
&\;\leq&& \vdots \\[0.3ex]
d_{N-1} + \cdots + d_2 + d_1
&\;\leq&& \lambda_1 + \lambda_2 + \cdots + \lambda_{N-1} \\[0.3ex]
d_N + d_{N-1} + \cdots + d_2 + d_1
&\;=&& \lambda_1 + \lambda_2 + \cdots + \lambda_{N-1} + \lambda_N. \\[0.3ex]
\end{alignat}$$

The Schur–Horn theorem may thus be restated more succinctly and in plain English:

Schur–Horn theorem: Given any non-increasing real sequences of desired diagonal elements $d_1 \geq \cdots \geq d_N$ and desired eigenvalues $\lambda_1 \geq \cdots \geq \lambda_N,$ there exists a Hermitian matrix with these eigenvalues and diagonal elements if and only if these two sequences have the same sum and for every possible integer $n,$ the sum of the first $n$ desired diagonal elements never exceeds the sum of the first $n$ desired eigenvalues.

=== Reformation allowing unordered diagonals and eigenvalues ===
Although this theorem requires that $d_1 \geq \cdots \geq d_N$ and $\lambda_1 \geq \cdots \geq \lambda_N$ be non-increasing, it is possible to reformulate this theorem without these assumptions.

We start with the assumption $\lambda_1 \geq \cdots \geq \lambda_N.$ The left hand side of the theorem's characterization (that is, "there exists a Hermitian matrix with these eigenvalues and diagonal elements") depends on the order of the desired diagonal elements $d_1, \dots, d_N$ (because changing their order would change the Hermitian matrix whose existence is in question) but it does not depend on the order of the desired eigenvalues $\lambda_1, \dots, \lambda_N.$

On the right hand right hand side of the characterization, only the values of $\lambda_1 + \cdots + \lambda_n$ depend on the assumption $\lambda_1 \geq \cdots \geq \lambda_N.$ Notice that this assumption means that the expression $\lambda_1 + \cdots + \lambda_n$ is just notation for the sum of the $n$ largest desired eigenvalues. Replacing the expression $\lambda_1 + \cdots + \lambda_n$ with this written equivalent makes the assumption $\lambda_1 \geq \cdots \geq \lambda_N$ completely unnecessary:

Schur–Horn theorem: Given any $N$ desired real eigenvalues and a non-increasing real sequence of desired diagonal elements $d_1 \geq \cdots \geq d_N,$ there exists a Hermitian matrix with these eigenvalues and diagonal elements if and only if these two sequences have the same sum and for every possible integer $n,$ the sum of the first $n$ desired diagonal elements never exceeds the sum of the $n$ largest desired eigenvalues.

==== Permutation polytope generated by a vector ====
The permutation polytope generated by $\tilde{x} = (x_1, x_2,\ldots, x_n) \in \Reals^n$ denoted by $\mathcal{K}_{\tilde{x}}$ is defined as the convex hull of the set $\{(x_{\pi(1)},x_{\pi(2)},\ldots,x_{\pi(n)}) \in \Reals^n : \pi \in S_n\}.$ Here $S_n$ denotes the symmetric group on $\{1, 2, \ldots, n\}.$ In other words, the permutation polytope generated by $(x_1, \dots, x_n)$ is the convex hull of the set of all points in $\Reals^n$ that can be obtained by rearranging the coordinates of $(x_1, \dots, x_n).$ The permutation polytope of $(1, 1, 2),$ for instance, is the convex hull of the set $\{(1, 1, 2), (1, 2, 1), (2, 1, 1)\},$ which in this case is the solid (filled) triangle whose vertices are the three points in this set. Notice, in particular, that rearranging the coordinates of $(x_1, \dots, x_n)$ does not change the resulting permutation polytope; in other words, if a point $\tilde{y}$ can be obtained from $\tilde{x} = (x_1, \dots, x_n)$ by rearranging its coordinates, then $\mathcal{K}_{\tilde{y}} = \mathcal{K}_{\tilde{x}}.$

The following lemma characterizes the permutation polytope of a vector in $\Reals^n.$

Lemma—If $x_1 \geq \cdots \geq x_n,$ and $y_1 \geq \cdots \geq y_n,$ have the same sum $x_1 + \cdots + x_n = y_1 + \cdots + y_n,$ then the following statements are equivalent:

1. $\tilde{y} := (y_1, \cdots, y_n) \in \mathcal{K}_{\tilde{x}}.$
2. $y_1 \leq x_1,$ and $y_1 + y_2 \leq x_1 + x_2,$ and $\ldots,$ and $y_1 + y_2 + \cdots + y_{n-1} \leq x_1 + x_2 + \cdots + x_{n-1}$
3. There exist a sequence of points $\tilde{x}_1, \dots, \tilde{x}_n$ in $\mathcal{K}_{\tilde{x}},$ starting with $\tilde{x}_1 = \tilde{x}$ and ending with $\tilde{x}_n = \tilde{y}$ such that $\tilde{x}_{k+1} = t \tilde{x}_k + (1-t) \tau(\tilde{x_k})$ for each $k$ in $\{1, 2, \ldots, n-1\},$ some transposition $\tau$ in $S_n,$ and some $t$ in $[0,1],$ depending on $k.$

==== Reformulation of Schur–Horn theorem ====
In view of the equivalence of (i) and (ii) in the lemma mentioned above, one may reformulate the theorem in the following manner.

Theorem. Let $d_1, \dots, d_N$ and $\lambda_1, \dots, \lambda_N$ be real numbers. There is a Hermitian matrix with diagonal entries $d_1, \dots, d_N$ and eigenvalues $\lambda_1, \dots, \lambda_N$ if and only if the vector $(d_1, \ldots, d_n)$ is in the permutation polytope generated by $(\lambda_1, \ldots, \lambda_n).$

Note that in this formulation, one does not need to impose any ordering on the entries of the vectors $d_1, \dots, d_N$ and $\lambda_1, \dots, \lambda_N.$

== Proof of the Schur–Horn theorem ==
Let $A = (a_{jk})$ be a $n \times n$ Hermitian matrix with eigenvalues $\{\lambda_i\}_{i=1}^n,$ counted with multiplicity. Denote the diagonal of $A$ by $\tilde{a},$ thought of as a vector in $\Reals^n,$ and the vector $(\lambda_1, \lambda_2, \ldots, \lambda_n)$ by $\tilde{\lambda}.$ Let $\Lambda$ be the diagonal matrix having $\lambda_1, \lambda_2, \ldots, \lambda_n$ on its diagonal.

($\Rightarrow$) $A$ may be written in the form $U \Lambda U^{-1},$ where $U$ is a unitary matrix. Then
$$a_{ii} = \sum_{j=1}^n \lambda_j |u_{ij}|^2, \; i = 1, 2, \ldots, n.$$

Let $S = (s_{ij})$ be the matrix defined by $s_{ij} = |u_{ij}|^2.$ Since $U$ is a unitary matrix, $S$ is a doubly stochastic matrix and we have $\tilde{a} = S\tilde{\lambda}.$ By the Birkhoff–von Neumann theorem, $S$ can be written as a convex combination of permutation matrices. Thus $\tilde{a}$ is in the permutation polytope generated by $\tilde{\lambda}.$ This proves Schur's theorem.

($\Leftarrow$) If $\tilde{a}$ occurs as the diagonal of a Hermitian matrix with eigenvalues $\{\lambda_i\}_{i=1}^n,$ then $t\tilde{a} + (1-t)\tau(\tilde{a})$ also occurs as the diagonal of some Hermitian matrix with the same set of eigenvalues, for any transposition $\tau$ in $S_n.$ One may prove that in the following manner.

Let $\xi$ be a complex number of modulus $1$ such that $\overline{\xi a_{jk}} = - \xi a_{jk}$ and $U$ be a unitary matrix with $\xi \sqrt{t}, \sqrt{t}$ in the $j, j$ and $k, k$ entries, respectively, $-\sqrt{1-t}, \xi \sqrt{1-t}$ at the $j, k$ and $k, j$ entries, respectively, $1$ at all diagonal entries other than $j, j$ and $k, k,$ and $0$ at all other entries. Then $UAU^{-1}$ has $ta_{jj} + (1-t)a_{kk}$ at the $j, j$ entry, $(1-t)a_{jj} + ta_{kk}$ at the $k,k$ entry, and $a_{ll}$ at the $l,l$ entry where $l \neq j, k.$ Let $\tau$ be the transposition of $\{1, 2, \dots, n\}$ that interchanges $j$ and $k.$

Then the diagonal of $UAU^{-1}$ is $t\tilde{a} + (1-t)\tau(\tilde{a}).$

$\Lambda$ is a Hermitian matrix with eigenvalues $\{ \lambda_i \}_{i=1}^n.$ Using the equivalence of (i) and (iii) in the lemma mentioned above, we see that any vector in the permutation polytope generated by $(\lambda_1, \lambda_2, \ldots, \lambda_n),$ occurs as the diagonal of a Hermitian matrix with the prescribed eigenvalues. This proves Horn's theorem.

== Symplectic geometry perspective ==
The Schur–Horn theorem may be viewed as a corollary of the Atiyah–Guillemin–Sternberg convexity theorem in the following manner. Let $\mathcal{U}(n)$ denote the group of $n \times n$ unitary matrices. Its Lie algebra, denoted by $\mathfrak{u}(n),$ is the set of skew-Hermitian matrices. One may identify the dual space $\mathfrak{u}(n)^*$ with the set of Hermitian matrices $\mathcal{H}(n)$ via the linear isomorphism $\Psi : \mathcal{H}(n) \rightarrow \mathfrak{u}(n)^*$ defined by $\Psi(A)(B) = \mathrm{tr}(iAB)$ for $A \in \mathcal{H}(n), B \in \mathfrak{u}(n).$ The unitary group $\mathcal{U}(n)$ acts on $\mathcal{H}(n)$ by conjugation and acts on $\mathfrak{u}(n)^*$ by the coadjoint action. Under these actions, $\Psi$ is an $\mathcal{U}(n)$-equivariant map i.e. for every $U \in \mathcal{U}(n)$ the following diagram commutes,

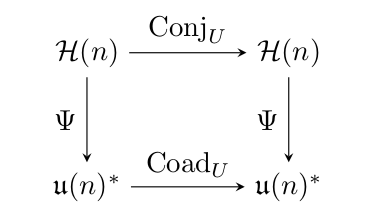

Let $\tilde{\lambda} = (\lambda_1, \lambda_2, \ldots, \lambda_n) \in \Reals^n$ and $\Lambda \in \mathcal{H}(n)$ denote the diagonal matrix with entries given by $\tilde{\lambda}.$ Let $\mathcal{O}_{\tilde{\lambda}}$ denote the orbit of $\Lambda$ under the $\mathcal{U}(n)$-action i.e. conjugation. Under the $\mathcal{U}(n)$-equivariant isomorphism $\Psi,$ the symplectic structure on the corresponding coadjoint orbit may be brought onto $\mathcal{O}_{\tilde{\lambda}}.$ Thus $\mathcal{O}_{\tilde{\lambda}}$ is a Hamiltonian $\mathcal{U}(n)$-manifold.

Let $\mathbb{T}$ denote the Cartan subgroup of $\mathcal{U}(n)$ which consists of diagonal complex matrices with diagonal entries of modulus $1.$ The Lie algebra $\mathfrak{t}$ of $\mathbb{T}$ consists of diagonal skew-Hermitian matrices and the dual space $\mathfrak{t}^*$ consists of diagonal Hermitian matrices, under the isomorphism $\Psi.$ In other words, $\mathfrak{t}$ consists of diagonal matrices with purely imaginary entries and $\mathfrak{t}^*$ consists of diagonal matrices with real entries. The inclusion map $\mathfrak{t} \hookrightarrow \mathfrak{u}(n)$ induces a map $\Phi : \mathcal{H}(n) \cong \mathfrak{u}(n)^* \rightarrow \mathfrak{t}^*,$ which projects a matrix $A$ to the diagonal matrix with the same diagonal entries as $A.$ The set $\mathcal{O}_{\tilde{\lambda}}$ is a Hamiltonian $\mathbb{T}$-manifold, and the restriction of $\Phi$ to this set is a moment map for this action.

By the Atiyah–Guillemin–Sternberg theorem, $\Phi(\mathcal{O}_{\tilde{\lambda}})$ is a convex polytope. A matrix $A \in \mathcal{H}(n)$ is fixed under conjugation by every element of $\mathbb{T}$ if and only if $A$ is diagonal. The only diagonal matrices in $\mathcal{O}_{\tilde{\lambda}}$ are the ones with diagonal entries $\lambda_1, \lambda_2, \ldots, \lambda_n$ in some order. Thus, these matrices generate the convex polytope $\Phi(\mathcal{O}_{\tilde{\lambda}}).$ This is exactly the statement of the Schur–Horn theorem.
