= Golden–Thompson inequality =

In physics and mathematics, the Golden–Thompson inequality is a trace inequality between exponentials of symmetric and Hermitian matrices proved independently by Golden (1965) and Thompson (1965). It has been developed in the context of statistical mechanics, where it has come to have a particular significance.

== Statement ==
The Golden–Thompson inequality states that for (real) symmetric or (complex) Hermitian matrices A and B, the following trace inequality holds:

$$\operatorname{tr}\, e^{A+B} \le \operatorname{tr} \left(e^A e^B\right).$$

This inequality is well defined, since the quantities on either side are real numbers. For the expression on the right hand side of the inequality, this can be seen by rewriting it as $\operatorname{tr}(e^{A/2}e^B e^{A/2})$ using the cyclic property of the trace.

Let $\|\cdot \|$ denote the Frobenius norm, then the Golden–Thompson inequality is equivalently stated as
$$\|e^{A+B}\| \leq \|e^A e^B \|.$$

=== Motivation ===
The Golden–Thompson inequality can be viewed as a generalization of a stronger statement for real numbers. If a and b are two real numbers, then the exponential of a+b is the product of the exponential of a with the exponential of b:

$$e^{a+b} = e^a e^b .$$

If we replace a and b with commuting matrices A and B, then the same inequality $e^{A+B} = e^A e^B$ holds.

This relationship is not true if A and B do not commute. In fact, Petz (1994) proved that if A and B are two Hermitian matrices for which the Golden–Thompson inequality is verified as an equality, then the two matrices commute. The Golden–Thompson inequality shows that, even though $e^{A+B}$ and $e^Ae^B$ are not equal, they are still related by an inequality.

=== Proof ===
Golden inequality (Golden (1965))—If $A, B$ are Hermitian and positive semidefinite, then
$$\operatorname{tr}((AB)^{2^{n}}) \leq \operatorname{tr}((A^{2^1}B^{2^1})^{2^{n-1}}) \leq \operatorname{tr}((A^{2^2}B^{2^2})^{2^{n-2}}) \leq \dots \leq \operatorname{tr}(A^{2^n}B^{2^n})$$

Proof
Proof

If $\operatorname{tr}((AB)^{2^{n}}) \leq \operatorname{tr}((A^{2^1}B^{2^1})^{2^{n-1}})$ for all $n$, then all the other inequalities are also proven as special cases of it. So it suffices to prove that inequality.

$n=0$ case is trivial.

$n = 1$ case. Since $A, B$ are Hermitian and PSD, we can split $A$ to $(\sqrt A)^2$, which allows us to write $\operatorname{tr}(ABAB) = \|\sqrt A B \sqrt A\|^2$, meaning it is a non-negative real number.

Now by Cauchy–Schwarz inequality,

$$\begin{aligned}
\operatorname{tr}(ABAB) &= \langle AB, BA\rangle \\
&\leq \|AB\| \|BA\| \\
&= \|AB\|^2\\
&= \operatorname{tr}(ABBA)\\
&= \operatorname{tr}(AABB)
\end{aligned}$$

$n \geq 2$ case. Define two sequences of matrices
$$a_k := (AB)^{2^{n-k}}(BA)^{2^{n-k}}, \quad b_k := (BA)^{2^{n-k}}(AB)^{2^{n-k}}$$
which, by construction, are Hermitian and positive semidefinite.

For any $N$, by the cyclic property of trace,
$$\begin{cases}\operatorname{tr}(a_k^N) &= \operatorname{tr}((a_{k+1} b_{k+1})^N) =  \operatorname{tr}(b_k^N), \quad \forall k \in 0:n-1 \\\operatorname{tr}(a_n^N) &= \operatorname{tr}((AABB)^N) = \operatorname{tr}(b_n^N)\end{cases}$$

By the same argument as $n=1$ case, $\operatorname{tr}((AB)^{2^{n}}) \leq \operatorname{tr}(a_1)$. Apply Cauchy–Schwarz, and the cyclic equalities,
$$\begin{aligned}
\operatorname{tr}(a_1) &= \operatorname{tr}(a_2b_2) \\
&= \langle a_2,b_2\rangle \\
&\leq \|a_2\| \|b_2\|  \\
&= \|a_2\|^2\\
&= \operatorname{tr}(a_2 a_2)
\end{aligned}$$

If $n = 2$, then $\operatorname{tr}(a_2a_2) = \operatorname{tr}((AABB)^2)$.

Otherwise, by induction, $\operatorname{tr}(a_2 a_2) = \operatorname{tr}((a_3b_3)^2) \leq \operatorname{tr}(a_3a_3b_3b_3)$ and continuing the same argument,$\operatorname{tr}(a_3a_3b_3b_3) \leq \operatorname{tr}(a_3^4)$. This continues until we obtain $\leq \operatorname{tr}(a_n^{2^{n-1}}) = \operatorname{tr}((AABB)^{2^{n-1}})$.

Golden–Thompson inequality (Thompson (1965))—Given Hermitian matrices $A, B$,

$$\operatorname{tr}(e^{A+B}) \leq \operatorname{tr}(e^A e^B)$$

Proof

By the Lie product formula, $\operatorname{tr}(e^{A+B}) = \lim_n \operatorname{tr}((e^{A/2^n}e^{B/2^n})^{2^n})$.

By the Golden inequality, $\operatorname{tr}((e^{A/2^n}e^{B/2^n})^{2^n}) \leq \operatorname{tr}(e^A e^B)$.

== Generalizations ==
=== Other norms ===
In general, if A and B are Hermitian matrices and $\|\cdot\|$ is a unitarily invariant norm, then (Bhatia 1997, Theorem IX.3.7)

$$\|e^{A+B}\| \leq \|e^{A}e^B\| .$$

The standard Golden–Thompson inequality is a special case of the above inequality, where the norm is the Frobenius norm.

The general case is provable in the same way, since unitarily invariant norms also satisfy the Cauchy-Schwarz inequality. (Bhatia 1997, Exercise IV.2.7)

Indeed, for a slightly more general case, essentially the same proof applies. For each $p \geq 1$, let $\|A\|_p^p := \operatorname{tr}(AA^*)^{p/2}$ be the Schatten norm.

Theorem—For any integer $N \geq 1$, $\|e^{A+B}\|_{2^N} \leq \|e^{A}e^{B}\|_{2^N}$. For any integer $N \geq 0$, $\|e^{A+B}\|_{2^N} \leq \|e^{A/2}e^{B}e^{A/2}\|_{2^N}$.

At $N \to\infty$ limit, we obtain the operator norm $\|e^{A+B}\|_{op} \leq \|e^{A}e^{B}\|_{op} = \|e^{A/2}e^{B}e^{A/2}\|_{op}$.

Proof Tao (2010)

It suffices to show that $\operatorname{tr}((e^{A+B})^{2^N}) \leq \operatorname{tr}((e^{2A}e^{2B})^{2^{N-1}})$.
$$\operatorname{tr}((e^{A+B})^{2^N}) = \lim_n \operatorname{tr}((e^{2^{N-n}A}e^{2^{N-n} B})^{2^n}) \leq \lim_n \operatorname{tr}((e^{2A}e^{ 2B})^{2^{N-1}})$$
by the Golden inequality.

The second claim is proven similarly.

Corollary—Given Hermitian $A, B$, if $e^A \preceq e^B$ then $A \preceq B$.

Proof Tao (2010)

For any $x$, we have $\langle e^Ax, x\rangle \leq \langle e^Bx, x\rangle$, thus $\|e^{A/2}x\|\leq \|e^{B/2}x\|$.

Thus $e^{-B/2}e^{A/2}$ is a contraction map, thus $\|e^{-B/2}e^{A/2}\|_{op} \leq 1$, thus $\|e^{A/2 - B/2}\|_{op} \leq 1$, thus all eigenvalues of $(A/2 - B/2)$ are nonpositive, thus $A \preceq B$.

=== Multiple matrices ===
The inequality has been generalized to three matrices by Lieb (1973) and furthermore to any arbitrary number of Hermitian matrices by Sutter, Berta & Tomamichel (2016). A naive attempt at generalization does not work: the inequality

$$\operatorname{tr}(e^{A+B+C}) \leq |\operatorname{tr}(e^Ae^Be^C)|$$

is false. For three matrices, the correct generalization takes the following form:

$$\operatorname{tr}\, e^{A+B+C} \le \operatorname{tr} \left(e^A \mathcal{T}_{e^{-B}} e^C\right),$$

where the operator $\mathcal{T}_f$ is the derivative of the matrix logarithm given by $\mathcal{T}_f(g) = \int_0^\infty \operatorname{d}t \, (f+t)^{-1} g (f+t)^{-1}$. Note that, if $f$ and $g$ commute, then $\mathcal{T}_f(g) = gf^{-1}$, and the inequality for three matrices reduces to the original from Golden and Thompson.

Bertram Kostant (1973) used the Kostant convexity theorem to generalize the Golden–Thompson inequality to all compact Lie groups.
