= Unitary matrix =

Complex matrix whose conjugate transpose equals its inverse

In linear algebra, an invertible complex square matrix U is unitary if its matrix inverse U^{−1} equals its conjugate transpose U^{*}, that is, if

$$U^* U = UU^* = I,$$

where I is the identity matrix.

In physics, especially in quantum mechanics, the conjugate transpose is referred to as the Hermitian adjoint of a matrix and is denoted by a dagger ($\dagger$), so the equation above is written

$$U^\dagger U = UU^\dagger = I.$$

A complex matrix U is special unitary if it is unitary and its matrix determinant equals 1.

For real numbers, the analogue of a unitary matrix is an orthogonal matrix. Unitary matrices have significant importance in quantum mechanics because they preserve the normalization of state vectors and the inner products between them.

== Properties ==
For any unitary matrix U of finite size, the following hold:

- Given two complex vectors x and y, multiplication by U preserves their inner product; that is, ⟨Ux, Uy⟩ = ⟨x, y⟩.
- U is normal ($U^* U = UU^*$).
- U is diagonalizable; that is, U is unitarily similar to a diagonal matrix, as a consequence of the spectral theorem. Thus, U has a decomposition of the form $U = VDV^*,$ where V is unitary, and D is diagonal and unitary.
- The eigenvalues of $U$ lie on the unit circle. That is, if the complex number λ is an eigenvalue of U then |λ| = 1.
- $|\det(U)| = 1$
- The eigenspaces of $U$ are orthogonal.
- U can be written as U = e^{iH}, where e indicates the matrix exponential, i is the imaginary unit, and H is a Hermitian matrix.

For any nonnegative integer n, the set of all n × n unitary matrices with matrix multiplication forms a group, called the unitary group U(n).

Every square matrix with unit Euclidean norm is the average of two unitary matrices.

== Equivalent conditions ==
If U is a square, complex matrix, then the following conditions are equivalent:

1. $U$ is unitary.
2. $U^*$ is unitary.
3. $U$ is invertible with $U^{-1} = U^*$.
4. The columns of $U$ form an orthonormal basis of $\Complex^n$ with respect to the usual inner product. In other words, $U^*U = I$.
5. The rows of $U$ form an orthonormal basis of $\Complex^n$ with respect to the usual inner product. In other words, $UU^* = I$.
6. $U$ is an isometry with respect to the usual norm. That is, $\|Ux\|_2 = \|x\|_2$ for all $x \in \Complex^n$, where $\|x\|_2 = \sqrt{\sum_{i=1}^n |x_i|^2}$.
7. $U$ is a normal matrix (equivalently, there is an orthonormal basis formed by eigenvectors of $U$) with eigenvalues lying on the unit circle.

== Elementary constructions ==
=== 2 × 2 unitary matrix ===
One general expression of a 2 × 2 unitary matrix is
$$U = \begin{bmatrix}
a & b \\
-e^{i\varphi} b^* & e^{i\varphi} a^* \\
\end{bmatrix},
\qquad
\left| a \right|^2 + \left| b \right|^2 = 1\ ,$$

which depends on 4 real parameters (the phase of a, the phase of b, the relative magnitude between a and b, and the angle φ) and * is the complex conjugate. The form is configured so the determinant of such a matrix is
$$\det(U) = e^{i \varphi} ~.$$

The sub-group of those elements $U$ with $\det(U) = 1$ is called the special unitary group SU(2).

Among several alternative forms, the matrix U can be written in this form:
$$\ U = e^{i\varphi / 2} \begin{bmatrix}
e^{i\alpha} \cos \theta & e^{i\beta} \sin \theta \\
-e^{-i\beta} \sin \theta & e^{-i\alpha} \cos \theta \\
\end{bmatrix}\ ,$$

where $e^{i\alpha} \cos \theta = a$ and $e^{i\beta} \sin \theta = b,$ above, and the angles $\varphi, \alpha, \beta, \theta$ can take any values.

By introducing $\alpha = \psi + \delta$ and $\beta = \psi - \delta,$ has the following factorization:

$$U = e^{i\varphi /2} \begin{bmatrix}
e^{i\psi} & 0 \\
0 & e^{-i\psi}
\end{bmatrix}
\begin{bmatrix}
\cos \theta  & \sin \theta \\
-\sin \theta & \cos \theta \\
\end{bmatrix}
\begin{bmatrix}
e^{i\delta} & 0 \\
0 & e^{-i\delta}
\end{bmatrix} ~.$$

This expression highlights the relation between 2 × 2 unitary matrices and 2 × 2 orthogonal matrices of angle θ.

Another factorization is

$$U = \begin{bmatrix}
\cos \rho  &   -\sin \rho \\
\sin \rho  &   \;\cos \rho \\
\end{bmatrix}
\begin{bmatrix}
e^{i\xi} & 0 \\
0 & e^{i\zeta}
\end{bmatrix}
\begin{bmatrix}
\;\cos \sigma  &   \sin \sigma \\
-\sin \sigma   &   \cos \sigma \\
\end{bmatrix} ~.$$

Many other factorizations of a unitary matrix in basic matrices are possible.

== See also ==
- Hermitian matrix
- Skew-Hermitian matrix
- Matrix decomposition
- Orthogonal group O(n)
- Special orthogonal group SO(n)
- Orthogonal matrix
- Semi-orthogonal matrix
- Quantum logic gate
- Special Unitary group SU(n)
- Symplectic matrix
- Unitary group U(n)
- Unitary operator
- Unitary transformation
