= Skew-Hermitian matrix =

Matrix whose conjugate transpose is its negative (additive inverse)

In linear algebra, a square matrix with complex entries is said to be skew-Hermitian or anti-Hermitian if its conjugate transpose is the negative of the original matrix. That is, the matrix $A$ is skew-Hermitian if it satisfies the relation

$A \text{ skew-Hermitian} \quad \iff \quad A^\mathsf{H} = -A$

where $A^\textsf{H}$ denotes the conjugate transpose of the matrix $A$. In component form, this means that

$A \text{ skew-Hermitian} \quad \iff \quad a_{ij} = -\overline{a_{ji}}$

for all indices $i$ and $j$, where $a_{ij}$ is the element in the $i$-th row and $j$-th column of $A$, and the overline denotes complex conjugation.

Skew-Hermitian matrices can be understood as the complex versions of real skew-symmetric matrices, or as the matrix analogue of the purely imaginary numbers. The set of all skew-Hermitian $n \times n$ matrices forms the $u(n)$ Lie algebra, which corresponds to the Lie group U(n). The concept can be generalized to include linear transformations of any complex vector space with a Hermitian product.

Note that the adjoint of an operator depends on the scalar product considered on the $n$ dimensional complex or real space $K^n$. If $(\cdot\mid\cdot)$ denotes the scalar product on $K^n$, then saying $A$ is skew-adjoint means that for all $\mathbf u, \mathbf v \in K^n$ one has $(A \mathbf u \mid \mathbf v) = - (\mathbf u \mid A \mathbf v)$.

In dimension 1, the skew-adjoint operators are exactly the imaginary numbers, whereas real numbers correspond to self-adjoint operators.

== Example ==
For example, the following matrix is skew-Hermitian
$$A = \begin{bmatrix} -i & 2 + i \\ -2 + i & 0 \end{bmatrix}$$
because
$$-A =
\begin{bmatrix} i & -2 - i \\ 2 - i & 0 \end{bmatrix} =
\begin{bmatrix}
\overline{-i}    & \overline{-2 + i} \\
\overline{2 + i} & \overline{0}
\end{bmatrix} =
\begin{bmatrix}
\overline{-i}     & \overline{2 + i} \\
\overline{-2 + i} &     \overline{0}
\end{bmatrix}^\mathsf{T} =
A^\mathsf{H}$$

== Properties ==
- The eigenvalues of a skew-Hermitian matrix are all purely imaginary (and possibly zero). Furthermore, skew-Hermitian matrices are normal. Hence they are diagonalizable and their eigenvectors for distinct eigenvalues must be orthogonal.
- All entries on the main diagonal of a skew-Hermitian matrix have to be pure imaginary; i.e., on the imaginary axis (the number zero is also considered purely imaginary).
- If $A$ and $B$ are skew-Hermitian, then $aA + bB$ is skew-Hermitian for all real scalars $a$ and $b$.
- $A$ is skew-Hermitian if and only if $i A$ (or equivalently, $-i A$) is Hermitian.
- $A$ is skew-Hermitian if and only if the real part $\Re{(A)}$ is skew-symmetric and the imaginary part $\Im{(A)}$ is symmetric.
- If $A$ is skew-Hermitian, then $A^k$ is Hermitian if $k$ is an even integer and skew-Hermitian if $k$ is an odd integer.
- $A$ is skew-Hermitian if and only if $\mathbf{x}^\mathsf{H} A \mathbf{y} = -\overline{\mathbf{y}^\mathsf{H} A \mathbf{x}}$ for all vectors $\mathbf x, \mathbf y$.
- If $A$ is skew-Hermitian, then the matrix exponential $e^A$ is unitary.
- The space of skew-Hermitian matrices forms the Lie algebra $u(n)$ of the Lie group $U(n)$.

== Decomposition into Hermitian and skew-Hermitian ==
- The sum of a square matrix and its conjugate transpose $\left(A + A^\mathsf{H}\right)$ is Hermitian.
- The difference of a square matrix and its conjugate transpose $\left(A - A^\mathsf{H}\right)$ is skew-Hermitian. This implies that the commutator of two Hermitian matrices is skew-Hermitian.
- An arbitrary square matrix $C$ can be written as the sum of a Hermitian matrix $A$ and a skew-Hermitian matrix $B$:
  $$C = A + B \quad\mbox{with}\quad A = \frac{1}{2}\left(C + C^\mathsf{H}\right) \quad\mbox{and}\quad B = \frac{1}{2}\left(C - C^\mathsf{H}\right)$$

== See also ==
- Bivector (complex)
- Hermitian matrix
- Normal matrix
- Skew-symmetric matrix
- Unitary matrix
