= Hermitian matrix =

Matrix equal to its conjugate-transpose

In mathematics, a Hermitian matrix (or self-adjoint matrix) is a square matrix with complex-valued entries that is equal to its own conjugate transpose. That is, if the element in the $j$-th row and $k$-th column of a Hermitian matrix $A$ is some complex number $A_{jk} = x + iy$, then the element in the $k$-th row and $j$-th column is its complex conjugate $A_{kj} = \overline{A_{jk} } = x - iy$, for every pair of indices $j$ and $k$. Hermitian matrices can be understood as the complex generalization of symmetric real matrices.

Using the notation $\textstyle A^\mathsf{T}$ to mean the transpose of $A$ and an overline to mean the entrywise complex conjugate of a matrix, the Hermitian property is equivalent to the equality
$$A = \overline{A^\mathsf{T}}.$$

The conjugate transpose of a matrix is often denoted $\textstyle A^\mathsf{H}$, in terms of which the Hermitian property can be more concisely expressed as $\textstyle A = A^\mathsf{H}$. Equivalent notations in common use include $\textstyle A^\mathsf{H}$, $\textstyle A^\dagger$, and $\textstyle A^*$, although in quantum mechanics, $\textstyle A^*$ typically means the complex conjugate only, and not the conjugate transpose.

Hermitian matrices are named after Charles Hermite, who demonstrated in 1855 that matrices of this form share with symmetric real matrices the property of always having real eigenvalues.

== Alternative characterizations ==
Hermitian matrices can be characterized in a number of equivalent ways, some of which are listed below:

=== Equality with the adjoint ===
A square matrix $A$ is Hermitian if and only if it is equal to its conjugate transpose, that is, for any pair of vectors $\mathbf v, \mathbf w$, it satisfies
$$\langle \mathbf v, A \mathbf w \rangle = \langle A \mathbf v, \mathbf w \rangle,$$
where $\langle \cdot, \cdot \rangle$ denotes the standard inner product operation in complex coordinate space, a Hermitian form defined by $\langle \mathbf{v}, \mathbf{w} \rangle = \mathbf{v}^\mathsf{H} \mathbf{w}$.

This is also the way that the more general concept of self-adjoint operator is defined.

=== Real-valuedness of quadratic forms ===
An $n \times n$ matrix $A$ is Hermitian if and only if
$$\langle \mathbf{v}, A \mathbf{v} \rangle \in \R, \quad \text{for all } \mathbf{v} \in \C^n.$$

=== Spectral properties ===
A square matrix is Hermitian if and only if it is unitarily diagonalizable with real eigenvalues.

== Applications ==
Hermitian matrices are fundamental to quantum mechanics because they describe operators with necessarily real eigenvalues. An eigenvalue $a$ of an operator $\textstyle \hat{A}$ on some quantum state $| \psi \rangle$ is one of the possible measurement outcomes of the operator, which requires the operator to have real eigenvalues.

In signal processing, Hermitian matrices are utilized in tasks like Fourier analysis and signal representation. The eigenvalues and eigenvectors of Hermitian matrices play a crucial role in analyzing signals and extracting meaningful information.

Hermitian matrices are extensively studied in linear algebra and numerical analysis. They have well-defined spectral properties, and many numerical algorithms, such as the Lanczos algorithm, exploit these properties for efficient computations. Hermitian matrices also appear in techniques like singular value decomposition (SVD) and eigenvalue decomposition.

In statistics and machine learning, Hermitian matrices are used as covariance matrices, which represent the relationships between different variables. The positive definiteness of a Hermitian covariance matrix ensures the well-definedness of multivariate distributions.

Hermitian matrices are applied in the design and analysis of communications systems, especially in the field of multiple-input multiple-output (MIMO) systems. Channel matrices in MIMO systems often exhibit Hermitian properties.

In graph theory, Hermitian matrices are used to study the spectra of graphs. The Hermitian Laplacian matrix is a key tool in this context, as it is used to analyze the spectra of mixed graphs. The Hermitian-adjacency matrix of a mixed graph is another important concept, as it is a Hermitian matrix that plays a role in studying the energies of mixed graphs.

== Examples ==
In the following example, $i$ denotes the imaginary unit ($i = \sqrt{-1}$):
$$\begin{bmatrix}
0 & a - ib & c - id \\
a + ib & 1 & m - in \\
c + id & m + in & 2
\end{bmatrix}.$$

Each of the diagonal elements must be real, as it must be its own complex conjugate.

Well-known families of Hermitian matrices include the Pauli matrices, the Gell-Mann matrices, and their generalizations. In theoretical physics, such Hermitian matrices are often multiplied by imaginary coefficients, which results in skew-Hermitian matrices.

Here is another useful case of a Hermitian matrix. If a square matrix $A$ equals the product of a matrix $B$ with its conjugate transpose, that is, $A = BB^\mathsf{H}$, then $A$ is Hermitian positive semi-definite. Furthermore, if $B$ is non-singular (i.e., row full-rank), then $A$ is positive definite.

== Properties ==
=== Main diagonal values are real ===
The entries on the main diagonal (top left to bottom right) of any Hermitian matrix are real.

Proof

$H_{jk} = \overline{H_{kj}}$ by definition of a Hermitian matrix; so $H_{jj} = \overline{ H_{jj} }$, and the above follows, as a number can equal its complex conjugate only if their imaginary parts are zero.

Only the main diagonal entries are necessarily real; a Hermitian matrix can have arbitrary complex-valued entries as its off-diagonal elements, as long as its diagonally-opposite entries are complex conjugates.

=== Symmetric if and only if real ===
A Hermitian matrix is symmetric if and only if it has only real entries. A symmetric real matrix is simply a special case of a Hermitian matrix.

Proof

$H_{jk} = \overline{H_{kj}}$ by definition of a Hermitian matrix. Thus,
$H_{jk} = H_{kj}$ (i.e., $H$ is symmetric) if and only if $\overline{H_{kj}} = H_{kj}$ (i.e., $H_{kj}$ is real).

==== Related special case ====
If an anti-symmetric real matrix is multiplied by an imaginary number, then the product is also anti-symmetric but has only imaginary entries. An anti-symmetric imaginary matrix is another special case of a Hermitian matrix.

=== Normal ===
Every Hermitian matrix $A$ is a normal matrix; that is to say, $AA^\mathsf{H} = A^\mathsf{H}A$.

Proof

$A = A^\mathsf{H}$, so $AA^\mathsf{H} = AA = A^\mathsf{H}A$.

=== Diagonalizable ===
The finite-dimensional spectral theorem says that any $n \times n$ Hermitian matrix $A$ can be diagonalized by a unitary matrix, and that the resulting diagonal matrix has only real entries. That is:

- all eigenvalues of $A$ are real; (Note: But a Hermitian matrix need not have any purely real eigenvectors. For example, $$A = \begin{bmatrix} 0 & i \\ -i & 0 \end{bmatrix}$$ is Hermitian. It has eigenvalues $\lambda_1 = 1$ and $\lambda_2 = -1$; the corresponding eigenvectors are scalar multiples of $$\mathbf{v}_1 = \begin{bmatrix} i \\ 1 \end{bmatrix} \quad \text{and} \quad \mathbf{v}_2 = \begin{bmatrix} -i \\ 1 \end{bmatrix},$$ neither of which is a non-zero scalar multiple of any real-valued vector.)
- $A$ has $n$ linearly independent eigenvectors;
- $A$ has orthogonal eigenvectors for distinct eigenvalues;
- even if $A$ has degenerate eigenvalues (*), it is always possible to find an orthogonal basis of $\C^n$ consisting of $n$ eigenvectors of $A$;
- then, it is always possible to normalize these eigenvectors.

(*) A degenerate eigenvalue is an eigenvalue having more than one eigenvector.

=== Sum of Hermitian matrices is Hermitian ===
The sum of any two Hermitian matrices is Hermitian.

Proof

$(A + B)_{jk} = A_{jk} + B_{jk} = \overline{A_{kj}} + \overline{B_{kj}} = \overline{A_{kj} + B_{kj}} = \overline{(A + B)_{kj}}.$

=== Inverse of Hermitian matrix is Hermitian ===
The inverse of an invertible Hermitian matrix is Hermitian as well.

Proof

If $A^{-1}A = I$, then $I = I^\mathsf{H} = \left( A^{-1}A \right)^\mathsf{H} = A^\mathsf{H} \left( A^{-1} \right)^\mathsf{H} = A \left( A^{-1} \right)^\mathsf{H},$ so $A^{-1} = \left( A^{-1} \right)^\mathsf{H}$.

=== Commutative product of Hermitian matrices is Hermitian ===
The product of two Hermitian matrices $A$ and $B$ is Hermitian if and only if $AB = BA$.

Proof

$(AB)^\mathsf{H} = \overline{(AB)^\mathsf{T}} = \overline{B^\mathsf{T} A^\mathsf{T}} = \overline{B^\mathsf{T}} \ \overline{A^\mathsf{T}} = B^\mathsf{H} A^\mathsf{H} = BA.$
Thus, $(AB)^\mathsf{H} = AB$ if and only if $AB = BA$.

Consequence: If a matrix $A$ is Hermitian, then for any integer $k \geq 0$, $A^k$ is Hermitian.

=== ABA is Hermitian ===
If two matrices $A$ and $B$ are Hermitian, then $ABA$ is also Hermitian.

Proof

$(ABA)^\mathsf{H} = \big( A(BA) \big)^\mathsf{H} = (BA)^\mathsf{H} A^\mathsf{H} = A^\mathsf{H} B^\mathsf{H} A^\mathsf{H} = ABA.$

=== A defines a Hermitian form ===
If a matrix $A$ is Hermitian, then it defines a Hermitian form (also called a symmetric sesquilinear form), the function
$$(\mathbf{u}, \mathbf{v}) \mapsto \mathbf{u}^\mathsf{H}\!A \mathbf{v}.$$
Conversely, every Hermitian form can be represented by some Hermitian matrix $A$. A Hermitian form is a complex-valued function of two vector arguments which is linear in one argument and antilinear in the other, such that exchanging the arguments gives the complex conjugate of the result. That is, for any vectors $\mathbf u$, $\mathbf v$, $\mathbf w$ and any complex scalar $c$,
$$\begin{align}
(\mathbf{u} + \mathbf{v})^\mathsf{H}\!A \mathbf{w} &= \mathbf{u}^\mathsf{H}\!A \mathbf{w} + \mathbf{v}^\mathsf{H}\!A \mathbf{w},
& (c~\!\mathbf{u})^\mathsf{H}\!A \mathbf{v} &= \overline{c} \bigl( \mathbf{u}^\mathsf{H}\!A \mathbf{v} \bigr), \\[3pt]
\mathbf{u}^\mathsf{H}\!A (\mathbf{v} + \mathbf{w}) &= \mathbf{u}^\mathsf{H}\!A \mathbf{v} + \mathbf{u}^\mathsf{H}\!A \mathbf{w},
& \mathbf{u}^\mathsf{H}\!A (c~\!\mathbf{v}) &= c \bigl( \mathbf{u}^\mathsf{H}\!A \mathbf{v} \bigr), \\[1pt]
\mathbf{u}^\mathsf{H}\!A \mathbf{v} &= \overline{ \mathbf{v}^\mathsf{H}\!A \mathbf{u} }.
\end{align}$$

The standard inner product $\langle \mathbf{u}, \mathbf{v} \rangle = \mathbf{u}^\mathsf{H} \mathbf{v}$ in complex coordinate space is the Hermitian form associated with the identity matrix.

For any Hermitian matrix $A$, $\mathbf{v}^\mathsf{H}\!A \mathbf{v}$ is a real number, because
$$\mathbf{v}^\mathsf{H}\!A \mathbf{v} = \overline{ \mathbf{v}^\mathsf{H}\!A \mathbf{v} }.$$
This is especially important in quantum physics, where Hermitian matrices are operators that measure properties of a system (e.g., total spin), which have to be real.

=== Complex Hermitian matrices form vector space over ℝ ===
The Hermitian complex $n{\times}n$ matrices do not form a vector space over the complex numbers, $\C$, since the identity matrix $I_n$ is Hermitian, but $i I_n$ is not. However, the complex Hermitian matrices do form a vector space over the real numbers, $\R$. In the $2n^2 \!$-dimensional vector space of complex $n{\times}n$ matrices over $\R$, the complex Hermitian matrices form a subspace of dimension $n^2$.

Indeed, $E_{jk}$ denoting the $n{\times}n$ matrix with a $1$ in the $j,k$ position and zeros elsewhere, a basis (orthonormal with respect to the Frobenius inner product) can be described as follows:
$$E_{jj} \text{ for } 1 \leq j \leq n \quad (n \text{ matrices})$$
together with the set of matrices of the form
$$\frac{1}{\sqrt{2}} \left( E_{jk} + E_{kj} \right) \text{ for } 1 \leq j < k \leq n \quad \left( \frac{n^2-n}2 \text{ matrices} \right)$$
and the set of matrices of the form
$$\frac{i}{\sqrt{2}} \left( E_{jk} - E_{kj} \right) \text{ for } 1 \leq j < k \leq n \quad \left( \frac{n^2-n}2 \text{ matrices} \right),$$
where $i$ denotes the imaginary unit ($i = \sqrt{-1}$).

An example is that the four Pauli matrices form a complete basis for the vector space of all complex $2 \times 2$ Hermitian matrices over $\R$.

=== Eigendecomposition ===
If $n$ orthonormal eigenvectors $\mathbf{u}_1, \dots, \mathbf{u}_n$ of a Hermitian matrix $A$ are chosen and written as the columns of a matrix $U$, then one eigendecomposition of $A$ is
$$A = U \varLambda \, U^\mathsf{H},$$
where $U$ is a unitary matrix (i.e., $U U^\mathsf{H} = I = U^\mathsf{H} U$), and $\varLambda$ is a diagonal matrix with $A$'s eigenvalues on $\varLambda$'s diagonal. Therefore, the spectral decomposition of $A$ can also be written as
$$A = \sum_{j=1}^n \lambda_j \mathbf{u}_j \mathbf{u}_j^\mathsf{H}$$
(where $\mathbf{u}_j$ is the $j$-th column of $U$).

Taking the $(j,k)$-entry directly yields
$$A_{jk} = \sum_{\ell=1}^n \lambda_\ell U_{j \ell} \overline{U_{k \ell}}.$$

For example, consider the $2 \times 2$ normal matrix
$$A = \begin{bmatrix} 1 & 2 \\ 2 & 1 \end{bmatrix}.$$
$A$'s eigenvalues are $\lambda_1 = 3$ and $\lambda_2 = -1$.

$A$'s possible normalized eigenvectors corresponding to these eigenvalues are
$$\mathbf{u}_1 = \frac{1}{\sqrt 2} \begin{bmatrix} 1 \\ 1 \end{bmatrix}
\quad \text{and} \quad
\mathbf{u}_2 = \frac{1}{\sqrt 2} \begin{bmatrix} -1 \\ \phantom{-}1 \end{bmatrix}.$$

So $A = U \varLambda \, U^\mathsf{H}$, where
$$U = \begin{bmatrix} \frac1{\sqrt 2} & -\frac1{\sqrt 2} \\ \frac1{\sqrt 2} & \phantom{-}\frac1{\sqrt 2} \end{bmatrix},\quad
\varLambda = \begin{bmatrix} 3 & 0 \\ 0 & -1 \end{bmatrix},\quad
U^\mathsf{H} = U^{-1} = \begin{bmatrix} \phantom{-}\frac1{\sqrt 2} & \frac1{\sqrt 2} \\ -\frac1{\sqrt 2} & \frac1{\sqrt 2} \end{bmatrix}.$$

This decomposition can also be written as
$$\begin{align}
A
&= 3 \, \mathbf{u}_1 \mathbf{u}_1^\mathsf{H} - 1 ~\! \mathbf{u}_2 \mathbf{u}_2^\mathsf{H} \\[2pt]
&= 3 \begin{bmatrix} \frac1{\sqrt 2} \\ \frac1{\sqrt 2} \end{bmatrix}
\begin{bmatrix} \frac1{\sqrt 2} & \frac1{\sqrt 2} \end{bmatrix}
- 1 \! \begin{bmatrix} -\frac1{\sqrt 2} \\ \phantom{-}\frac1{\sqrt 2} \end{bmatrix}
\begin{bmatrix} -\frac1{\sqrt 2} & \frac1{\sqrt 2} \end{bmatrix} \\[3pt]
&= 3 \begin{bmatrix} \frac12 & \frac12 \\ \frac12 & \frac12 \end{bmatrix}
- 1 \! \begin{bmatrix} \phantom{-}\frac12 & -\frac12 \\ -\frac12 & \phantom{-}\frac12 \end{bmatrix} \\[3pt]
&= \begin{bmatrix} 1 & 2 \\ 2 & 1 \end{bmatrix}.
\end{align}$$

Taking the $(1,1)$-entry, for example, directly yields
$$A_{11} = 3 \, U_{11} \overline{U_{11}} - 1 ~\! U_{12} \overline{U_{12}} = 3 \, \left| \frac{1}{\sqrt 2} \right|^2 - 1 ~\! \left| -\frac{1}{\sqrt 2} \right|^2 = \frac{3}{2} - \frac{1}{2} = 1.$$

=== Singular values ===
The singular values of a normal matrix are the absolute values of its eigenvalues.

Since a Hermitian matrix $A$ has an eigendecomposition $A = U \varLambda \, U^\mathsf{H}$, where $U$ is a unitary matrix (its columns are orthonormal vectors—see above, and its rows are also orthonormal vectors), a singular value decomposition of $A$ is
$$A = U \, |\varLambda| \sgn(\!\varLambda) \, U^\mathsf{H},$$
where $|\varLambda|$ and $\sgn(\!\varLambda)$ are diagonal matrices respectively containing the absolute values $|\lambda_i|$ and signs $\sgn(\lambda_i)$ of $A$'s eigenvalues. The matrix $\sgn(\!\varLambda) \, U^\mathsf{H}$ is unitary, since the rows (not the columns) of $U^\mathsf{H}$ are only getting multiplied by $\pm 1$. The matrix $|\varLambda|$ contains the singular values of $A$, namely, the absolute values of $A$'s eigenvalues (since $A$ is normal).

=== Real determinant ===
The determinant of a Hermitian matrix is real.

Proof

For any complex matrix $A$,

$$\det \left( A^\mathsf{T} \right) = \det(A) \quad \Rightarrow \quad \det \left( A^\mathsf{H} \right) = \overline{\det(A)}.$$

Therefore,

$$A = A^\mathsf{H} \quad \Rightarrow \quad \det(A) = \overline{\det(A)}.$$

Other proof

The determinant is the product of the matrix's eigenvalues, and as mentioned before, the eigenvalues of a Hermitian matrix are real.

== Decomposition into Hermitian and skew-Hermitian matrices ==
Additional facts related to Hermitian matrices include:

- The sum $A + A^\mathsf{H}$ of a square matrix and its conjugate transpose is Hermitian.
- The difference $A - A^\mathsf{H}$ of a square matrix and its conjugate transpose is skew-Hermitian (also called antihermitian). This implies that the commutator of two Hermitian matrices is skew-Hermitian.
- An arbitrary square matrix $C$ can be written as the sum $C = A + B$ of a Hermitian matrix $A$ and a skew-Hermitian matrix $B$, where
  $$A = \tfrac{1}{2}{\left(C + C^\mathsf{H}\right)}, \quad B = \tfrac{1}{2}{\left(C - C^\mathsf{H}\right)}.$$
  This is known as the Toeplitz decomposition of $C$.

== Rayleigh quotient ==
For a complex matrix $M$ and a non-zero complex vector $\mathbf v$, the Rayleigh quotient, $R(M, \mathbf{v})$, is defined as the scalar:
$$R(M, \mathbf{v}) = \frac{\mathbf{v}^\mathsf{H} \! M \mathbf{v}}{\mathbf{v}^\mathsf{H} \mathbf{v}}.$$

For any non-zero complex scalar $c$,
$$R(M, c ~\! \mathbf{v}) = R(M, \mathbf{v}).$$

If $M$ is Hermitian, then for any complex vector $\mathbf{v} \neq \mathbf{0}$, $R(M, \mathbf{v})$ is real.

For a Hermitian matrix $M$, the Rayleigh quotient of an eigenvector $\mathbf v_j$ is the corresponding eigenvalue $\lambda_j$:
$$R(M, \mathbf v_j)
= \frac{\mathbf{v}_j^\mathsf{H} \! M \mathbf{v}_j}{\mathbf{v}_j^\mathsf{H} \mathbf{v}_j}
= \frac{ \lambda_j \bigl(\mathbf{v}_j^\mathsf{H} \mathbf{v}_j\bigr)}{\mathbf{v}_j^\mathsf{H} \mathbf{v}_j}
= \lambda_j.$$
The Rayleigh quotient reaches its minimum and maximum values for the eigenvectors which correspond to the minimum and maximum eigenvalues: for any complex vector $\mathbf{v} \neq \mathbf{0}$,
$$\lambda_\text{min} = R(M, \mathbf{v}_\text{min})
\, \leq \, R(M, \mathbf{v}) \, \leq \,
R(M, \mathbf{v}_\text{max}) = \lambda_\text{max}.$$

The Rayleigh quotient is used in the min-max theorem to get exact values of all eigenvalues. It is also used in eigenvalue algorithms to obtain an eigenvalue approximation from an eigenvector approximation. Specifically, this is the basis for Rayleigh quotient iteration.

The range of the Rayleigh quotient (for a fixed matrix that is not necessarily Hermitian) is called a numerical range (or spectrum in functional analysis). When the matrix is Hermitian, the numerical range is equal to the spectral norm. Still in functional analysis, $\left| \lambda \right|_\max$ is known as the spectral radius.

In the context of $C^* \!$-algebras or algebraic quantum mechanics, the function that to $M$ associates the Rayleigh quotient $R(M, \mathbf{v})$ for a fixed $\mathbf v$ and $M$ varying through the algebra would be referred to as a "vector state" of the algebra.

== See also ==
- Complex symmetric matrix – Matrix equal to its transpose
- Haynsworth inertia additivity formula – Counts positive, negative, and zero eigenvalues of a block partitioned Hermitian matrix
- Hermitian form – Generalization of complex inner products
- Normal matrix – Matrix that commutes with its conjugate transpose
- Schur–Horn theorem – Characterizes the diagonal of a Hermitian matrix with given eigenvalues
- Self-adjoint operator – Linear operator equal to its own adjoint
- Skew-Hermitian matrix – Matrix whose conjugate transpose is its negative (additive inverse) (anti-Hermitian matrix)
- Unitary matrix – Complex matrix whose conjugate transpose equals its inverse
- Vector space – Algebraic structure in linear algebra
