= Affiliated operator =

In mathematics, affiliated operators were introduced by Murray and von Neumann in the theory of von Neumann algebras as a technique for using unbounded operators to study modules generated by a single vector. Later Atiyah and Singer showed that index theorems for elliptic operators on closed manifolds with infinite fundamental group could naturally be phrased in terms of unbounded operators affiliated with the von Neumann algebra of the group. Algebraic properties of affiliated operators have proved important in L^{2} cohomology, an area between analysis and geometry that evolved from the study of such index theorems.

== Definition ==
Let M be a von Neumann algebra acting on a Hilbert space H. A closed and densely defined operator A is said to be affiliated with M if A commutes with every unitary operator U in the commutant of M. Equivalent conditions are that:

- each unitary U in M' should leave invariant the graph of A defined by $G(A)=\{(x,Ax):x\in D(A)\} \subseteq H\oplus H$.
- the projection onto G(A) should lie in M_{2}(M).
- each unitary U in M' should carry D(A), the domain of A, onto itself and satisfy UAU* = A there.
- each unitary U in M' should commute with both operators in the polar decomposition of A.

The last condition follows by uniqueness of the polar decomposition. If A has a polar decomposition

$$A=V|A|, \,$$

it says that the partial isometry V should lie in M and that the positive self-adjoint operator |A| should be affiliated with M. However, by the spectral theorem, a positive self-adjoint operator commutes with a unitary operator if and only if each of its spectral projections $E([0,N])$ does. This gives another equivalent condition:

- each spectral projection of |A| and the partial isometry in the polar decomposition of A lies in M.

== Measurable operators ==
In general the operators affiliated with a von Neumann algebra M need not necessarily be well-behaved under either addition or composition. However in the presence of a faithful semi-finite normal trace τ and the standard Gelfand–Naimark–Segal action of M on H = L^{2}(M, τ), Edward Nelson proved that the measurable affiliated operators do form a *-algebra with nice properties: these are operators such that τ(I − E([0,N])) < ∞ for N sufficiently large. This algebra of unbounded operators is complete for a natural topology, generalising the notion of convergence in measure. It contains all the non-commutative L^{p} spaces defined by the trace and was introduced to facilitate their study.

This theory can be applied when the von Neumann algebra M is type I or type II. When M = B(H) acting on the Hilbert space L^{2}(H) of Hilbert–Schmidt operators, it gives the well-known theory of non-commutative L^{p} spaces L^{p} (H) due to Schatten and von Neumann.

When M is in addition a finite von Neumann algebra, for example a type II_{1} factor, then every affiliated operator is automatically measurable, so the affiliated operators form a *-algebra, as originally observed in the first paper of Murray and von Neumann. In this case M is a von Neumann regular ring: for on the closure of its image |A| has a measurable inverse B and then T = BV^{*} defines a measurable operator with ATA = A. Of course in the classical case when X is a probability space and M = L^{∞} (X), we simply recover the *-algebra of measurable functions on X.

If however M is type III, the theory takes a quite different form. Indeed in this case, thanks to the Tomita–Takesaki theory, it is known that the non-commutative L^{p} spaces are no longer realised by operators affiliated with the von Neumann algebra. As Connes showed, these spaces can be realised as unbounded operators only by using a certain positive power of the reference modular operator. Instead of being characterised by the simple affiliation relation UAU^{*} = A, there is a more complicated bimodule relation involving the analytic continuation of the modular automorphism group.
