= Schatten norm =

Mathematical norm

In mathematics, specifically functional analysis, the Schatten norm (or Schatten–von-Neumann norm) arises as a generalization of p-integrability similar to the trace class norm and the Hilbert–Schmidt norm.

== Definition ==
Let $H_1$, $H_2$ be Hilbert spaces, and $T$ a (linear) bounded operator from $H_1$ to $H_2$. For $p\in [1,\infty)$, define the Schatten p-norm of $T$ as

$$\|T\| _p = [\operatorname{Tr} (|T|^p)]^{1/p},$$

where $|T|:=\sqrt{(T^*T)}$, using the operator square root.

If $T$ is compact and $H_1,\,H_2$ are separable, then

$$\|T\| _p := \bigg( \sum_{n\ge 1} s^p_n(T)\bigg)^{1/p}$$

for $s_1(T) \ge s_2(T) \ge \cdots \ge s_n(T) \ge \cdots \ge 0$ the singular values of $T$, i.e. the eigenvalues of the Hermitian operator $|T|:=\sqrt{(T^*T)}$.

=== Special cases ===
- The Schatten 1-norm is the nuclear norm (also known as the trace norm, or the Ky Fan n-norm).
- The Schatten 2-norm is the Frobenius norm.
- The Schatten ∞-norm is the spectral norm (also known as the operator norm, or the largest singular value).

== Properties ==
In the following we formally extend the range of $p$ to $[1,\infty]$ with the convention that $\|\cdot\|_{\infty}$ is the operator norm. The dual index to $p=\infty$ is then $q=1$.

- The Schatten norms are unitarily invariant: for unitary operators $U$ and $V$ and $p\in [1,\infty]$,

$$\|U T V\|_p = \|T\|_p.$$

- They satisfy Hölder's inequality: for all $p\in [1,\infty]$ and $q$ such that $\frac{1}{p} + \frac{1}{q} = 1$, and operators $S\in\mathcal{L}(H_2,H_3), T\in\mathcal{L}(H_1,H_2)$ defined between Hilbert spaces $H_1, H_2,$ and $H_3$ respectively,

$$\|ST\|_1 \leq \|S\|_p \|T\|_q.$$

If $p,q,r\in [1,\infty]$ satisfy $\tfrac{1}{p} + \tfrac{1}{q} = \tfrac{1}{r}$, then we have

$$\|ST\|_r \leq \|S\|_p \|T\|_q$$.

The latter version of Hölder's inequality is proven in higher generality (for noncommutative $L^p$ spaces instead of Schatten-p classes) in. (For matrices the latter result is found in.)

- Sub-multiplicativity: For all $p\in [1,\infty]$ and operators $S\in\mathcal{L}(H_2,H_3), T\in\mathcal{L}(H_1,H_2)$ defined between Hilbert spaces $H_1, H_2,$ and $H_3$ respectively,

$$\|ST\|_p \leq \|S\|_p \|T\|_p .$$

- Monotonicity: For $1\leq p\leq p'\leq\infty$,

$$\|T\|_1 \geq \|T\|_p \geq \|T\|_{p'} \geq \|T\|_\infty.$$

- Duality: Let $H_1, H_2$ be finite-dimensional Hilbert spaces, $p\in [1,\infty]$ and $q$ such that $\frac{1}{p} + \frac{1}{q} = 1$, then

$$\|S\|_p = \sup\lbrace |\langle S,T\rangle | \mid \|T\|_q = 1\rbrace,$$

where $\langle S,T\rangle = \operatorname{tr}(S^*T)$ denotes the Hilbert–Schmidt inner product.

- Let $(e_k)_k,(f_{k'})_{k'}$ be two orthonormal basis of the Hilbert spaces $H_1, H_2$, then for $p=1$

$$\|T\|_1 \leq \sum_{k,k'}\left|T_{k,k'}\right|.$$

== Remarks ==
Notice that $\|\cdot\|_2$ is the Hilbert–Schmidt norm (see Hilbert–Schmidt operator), $\|\cdot\|_1$ is the trace class norm (see trace class), and $\|\cdot\|_\infty$ is the operator norm (see operator norm).

Note that the matrix p-norm is often also written as $\|\cdot\|_p$, but it is not the same as Schatten norm. In fact, we have $\|A\|_{\text{matrix p-norm}, 2} = \|A\|_{\text{Schatten}, \infty}$.

For $p\in(0,1)$ the function $\|\cdot\|_p$ is an example of a quasinorm.

An operator which has a finite Schatten norm is called a Schatten class operator and the space of such operators is denoted by $S_p(H_1,H_2)$. With this norm, $S_p(H_1,H_2)$ is a Banach space, and a Hilbert space for p = 2.

Observe that $S_p(H_1,H_2) \subseteq \mathcal{K} (H_1,H_2)$, the algebra of compact operators. This follows from the fact that if the sum is finite the spectrum will be finite or countable with the origin as limit point, and hence a compact operator (see compact operator on Hilbert space).

== See also ==
- Matrix norms
