= Schatten =

Schatten is the German word for shadow. Schatten may also refer to:

== People ==
- Gerald Schatten, a US stem cell researcher
- Robert Schatten, a Polish mathematician

== Arts ==
- Schatten – Eine nächtliche Halluzination, a German silent film
