= Autonne =

Autonne is a surname. Notable people with the surname include:

- Kouame Autonne (born 2000), Ivorian-Emirati footballer
- Léon Autonne (1859–1916), French engineer
