= Elliott Ward Cheney Jr. =

American mathematician

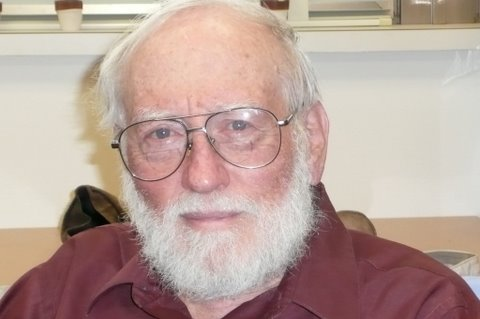
- Born: June 28, 1929; Gettysburg, Pennsylvania, US
- Died: July 13, 2016 (aged 87); Austin, Texas, US
- Education: Lehigh University; University of Kansas
- Known for: approximation theory research, mathematics textbooks
- Scientific career
- Workplaces: Convair; TRW Inc. UCLA; University of Texas at Austin
- Thesis: On Gauge Functions (1957)
- Doctoral advisor: Robert Schatten
- Doctoral students: Barry Boehm

Elliott Ward Cheney Jr. (June 28, 1929 – July 13, 2016) was an American mathematician and an emeritus professor at the University of Texas at Austin. Known to his friends and colleagues as Ward Cheney, he was one of the pioneers in the fields of approximation theory and numerical analysis. His 1966 book, An Introduction to Approximation Theory, remains in print and is "highly respected and well known", "a small book almost encyclopedic in character", and "is a classic with few competitors".

== Education and personal life ==
Cheney was born in Gettysburg, Pennsylvania, to E. W. Cheney Sr., and Carleton (Pratt) Cheney. He was the second of two children. He grew up in Washington, New Jersey, and Bethlehem, Pennsylvania. Ward began clarinet studies at age ten and would play in chamber music groups throughout his life.

Cheney was a 1947 graduate of Fountain Hill High School in Bethlehem, Pennsylvania. In 1951, he earned his bachelor's degree in mathematics from Lehigh University, where his father was a physics professor. During undergraduate summers, Ward worked for the United States Forest Service, where he met Elizabeth "Beth" Jean, whom he married in 1952. The young couple resided in Lawrence, Kansas, while Ward studied and served as a mathematics instructor at The University of Kansas, earning his Ph.D. in 1957. Ward had three children with his first wife, Beth, all of whom earned doctorates: daughter Margaret is a professor of mathematics, son David is a manager of international research projects, and son Elliott is a professional cellist. Their mother Beth remarried in 1975 and died in 1991. Ward and his wife Victoria had been together since 1983.

== Professional background ==
Following the launch of Sputnik 1 by the Soviet Union in 1957, the United States intensified its focus on its aerospace program. Cheney became a research scientist at Convair Astronautics in San Diego, California, where his mathematical team worked on calculations for the Atlas rocket—which would take John Glenn into space.

Cheney also worked for Space Technology Laboratories (now TRW Inc.), near Los Angeles, and taught at UCLA, with visiting positions at Michigan State University and Iowa State University. In addition, Ward was a consultant and/or a guest worker at Boeing Scientific Research Laboratories, The Aerospace Corporation, and IBM Research Laboratory. In the summers of 1961–63, he was director of the NSF Summer Institute in Numerical Analysis at the University of California, Los Angeles.

In 1964, Ward joined the mathematics faculty of The University of Texas at Austin, where he taught for the next 41 years, until his retirement at age 76.

== Career and travel ==
Cheney served continuously on the editorial board of the Journal of Approximation Theory from its inception in 1968 until sometime after the start of 2015, and published 14 papers there.

Professor Cheney supervised 17 PhD students, 35 Masters students, and worked with three post-doctoral students. He was Associate Editor for ten mathematical journals as well as referee and reviewer for many other journals. Cheney had over 100 published papers and was the author of two dozen mathematical textbooks, with several having multiple editions. A reviewer wrote of his 1986 monograph: "Cheney's book scores highly on all ... points". Ward Cheney and Will Light wrote two graduate level books. Ward Cheney and David Kincaid co-authored two undergraduate textbooks, and a graduate textbook.

During his career, Ward frequently spent his summers and a sabbatical semester in England at Lancaster University and at Leicester University. Also, he held a visiting professorship at Lund University, Sweden. Ward was a world-wide traveler and was frequently invited to give lectures on approximation theory at universities wherever he went.

== Teaching and research ==
Ward presented over 165 invited lectures and colloquium talks at universities and conferences around the world. Special honors include an invited lectures at the 1963 National Meeting of the Society for Industrial and Applied Mathematics (SIAM), in Denver, Colorado, and at the 1974 International Congress of Mathematicians, in Vancouver, Canada. Moreover, Professor Cheney was the honoree at the 1995 International Conference on Approximation Theory, College Station, Texas. For over 40 years, this has been the main general conference on approximation theory with presentations by international mathematician from academia, industry, and government.

Cheney was awarded grants for his research on approximation theory from the National Science Foundation, United States Air Force and United States Army as well as the UK Research Councils and the Italian Scientific Research Council, among others.

In 2012, Ward became a Fellow of the American Mathematical Society, which was the first year the honor was awarded.

Cheney died in July 2016, after having had Alzheimer's disease for several years.

== Books ==
- An Introduction to Approximation Theory, Ed. 2, American Mathematical Society Chelsea, 1982. ISBN 978-0-8218-1374-4
- Approximation Theory in Tensor Product Spaces (with Will Light), Springer, 1985. ISBN 978-3-540-16057-1; Light, William A.; Cheney, Elliot W. (2006-11-14). 2006 reprint. Springer. ISBN 9783540397410; pbk, 158 pages
- Multivariate Approximation Theory: Selected Topics, SIAM, 1986. (CBMS-NSF Regional Conference Series in Applied Mathematics 51) ISBN 978-0-89871-207-0
- A Course in Approximation Theory (with Will Light), American Mathematical Society, 2000. ISBN 0-8218-4798-8, ISBN 978-0-8218-4798-5; Cheney, Elliott Ward; Light, William Allan (2009-01-13). 2009 reprint. American Mathematical Soc. ISBN 9780821847985; pbk, 359 pages
- Analysis for Applied Mathematics, Springer Science+Business Media, New York, 2001. ISBN 978-1-4757-3559-8 (eBook)
- Numerical Analysis: Mathematics of Scientific Computing, Ed. 3 (with David Kincaid), American Mathematical Society, 2002. ISBN 0-534-38905-8; 1st edition, 1992
