= Square root of a 2 by 2 matrix =

A square root of a 2×2 matrix M is another 2×2 matrix R such that M = R^{2}, where R^{2} stands for the matrix product of R with itself. In general, there can be zero, two, four, or even an infinitude of square-root matrices. In many cases, such a matrix R can be obtained by an explicit formula.

Square roots that are not the all-zeros matrix come in pairs: if R is a square root of M, then −R is also a square root of M, since (−R)(−R) = (−1)(−1)(RR) = R^{2} = M.

A 2×2 matrix with two distinct nonzero eigenvalues has four square roots; in addition to negating both eigenvalues through negating the matrix (as shown above), negating one or the other of the eigenvalues individually will also yield valid square roots. A positive-definite matrix has precisely one positive-definite square root.

== A general formula ==
The following is a general formula that applies to almost any 2 × 2 matrix. Let the given matrix be
$$M = \begin{pmatrix} A & B \\ C & D \end{pmatrix},$$
where A, B, C, and D may be real or complex numbers. Furthermore, let τ = A + D be the trace of M, and δ = AD − BC be its determinant. Let s be such that s^{2} = δ, and t be such that t^{2} = τ + 2s. That is,
$$s = \pm\sqrt{\delta}, \qquad t = \pm\sqrt{\tau + 2s}.$$
Then, if t ≠ 0, a square root of M is
$$R = \frac{1}{t}\begin{pmatrix} A + s & B \\ C & D + s \end{pmatrix}
= \frac{1}{t}\left(M + sI\right).$$

Indeed, the square of R is
$$\begin{align}
R^2  &= \frac{1}{t^2}\begin{pmatrix}
A^2 + B C +  2 s A + s^2 & A B + B D + 2 s B \\
C A + D C +  2 s C & C B + D^2 + 2 s D + s^2
\end{pmatrix} \\[1ex]
&= \frac{1}{t^2}\begin{pmatrix}
A^2 + B C + 2 s A + A D - BC & A B + B D + 2 s B \\
A C + C D + 2 s C            & B C + D^2 + 2 s D + A D - B C
\end{pmatrix} \\[1ex]
&= \frac{1}{A + D + 2 s}\begin{pmatrix}
A(A + D + 2 s) & B(A + D + 2 s) \\
C(A + D + 2 s) & D(A + D + 2 s)
\end{pmatrix} = M.
\end{align}$$

The formula can also be derived via the Caylay–Hamilton theorem, substituting R and R² by √M and M, respectively, and expressing the principal invariants of R in terms of Ms.

Note that R may have complex entries even if M is a real matrix; this will be the case, in particular, if the determinant δ is negative.

The general case of this formula is when δ is nonzero, and τ^{2} ≠ 4δ, in which case s is nonzero, and t is nonzero for each choice of sign of s. Then the formula above will provide four distinct square roots R, one for each choice of signs for s and t; it is also related to the four possible combinations of signs for the two eigenvalues of R, with equal (opposite) signs being equivalent with a positive (negative) s, while a negative t swaps the sign of both eigenvalues.

=== Special cases of the formula ===
If the determinant δ is zero, but the trace τ is nonzero, the general formula above will give only two distinct solutions, corresponding to the two signs of t. Namely,
$$R = \pm\frac{1}{t}\begin{pmatrix} A & B \\ C & D \end{pmatrix}
= \pm\frac{1}{t} M,$$
where t is any square root of the trace τ.

The formula also gives only two distinct solutions if δ is nonzero, and τ^{2} = 4δ (the case of duplicate eigenvalues), in which case one of the choices for s will make the denominator t be zero. In that case, the two roots are
$$R = \pm\frac{1}{t}\begin{pmatrix} A + s & B \\ C & D + s \end{pmatrix}
= \pm\frac{1}{t} \left(M + s I \right),$$
where s is the square root of δ that makes τ − 2s nonzero, and t is any square root of τ − 2s.

The formula above fails completely if δ and τ are both zero; that is, if D = −A, and A^{2} = −BC, so that both the trace and the determinant of the matrix are zero. In this case, if M is the null matrix (with A = B = C = D = 0), then the null matrix is also a square root of M, as is any matrix
$$R = \begin{pmatrix} 0 & 0 \\ c & 0 \end{pmatrix}
\quad \text{and} \quad
R = \begin{pmatrix} 0 & b \\ 0 & 0 \end{pmatrix},$$
where b and c are arbitrary real or complex values. Otherwise M has no square root.

== Formulas for special matrices ==
=== Idempotent matrix ===
If M is an idempotent matrix, meaning that MM = M, then if it is not the identity matrix, its determinant is zero, and its trace equals its rank, which (excluding the zero matrix) is 1. Then the above formula has s = 0 and τ = 1, giving M and −M as two square roots of M.

=== Exponential matrix ===
If the matrix M can be expressed as real multiple of the exponent of some matrix A, $M = r \exp(A)$, then two of its square roots are $\pm\sqrt{r}\exp\left(\tfrac{1}{2}A\right)$. In this case the square root is real.

=== Diagonal matrix ===
If M is diagonal (that is, B = C = 0), one can use the simplified formula
$$R = \begin{pmatrix} a & 0 \\ 0 & d \end{pmatrix},$$
where $a = \pm\sqrt{A}$, and $d = \pm\sqrt{D}$. This, for the various sign choices, gives four, two, or one distinct matrices, if none of, only one of, or both A and D are zero, respectively.

=== Identity matrix ===
Because it has duplicate eigenvalues, the 2×2 identity matrix $\left(\begin{smallmatrix} 1 & 0 \\ 0 & 1 \end{smallmatrix}\right)$ has infinitely many symmetric rational square roots given by
$$\frac{1}{t} \begin{pmatrix}  s &  r\\  r & -s\end{pmatrix} \text{ and }
\begin{pmatrix} \pm 1 &  0\\  0 & \pm 1\end{pmatrix},$$
where (r, s, t) are any complex numbers such that $r^2 + s^2 = t^2.$

=== Matrix with one off-diagonal zero ===
If B is zero, but A and D are not both zero, one can use
$$R = \begin{pmatrix} a & 0 \\ \frac{C}{a + d} & d \end{pmatrix}.$$

This formula will provide two solutions if A = D or A = 0 or D = 0, and four otherwise. A similar formula can be used when C is zero, but A and D are not both zero.

=== Real matrices with real square roots ===
The algebra M(2, R) of 2×2 real matrices has three types of planar subalgebras. Each subalgebra admits the exponential map. If $p = \exp(q)$, then $\pm \exp\left(\tfrac{q}{2}\right)$ are square roots of p. The condition that the matrix is the image under exp limits it to half the plane of dual numbers, and to a quarter of the plane of split complex numbers, but does not constrain ordinary complex planes since the exponential mapping covers them. In the split-complex case there are two more square roots of p since each quadrant contains one.
