= Schatten class operator =

In mathematics, specifically functional analysis, a pth Schatten-class operator is a bounded linear operator on a Hilbert space with finite pth Schatten norm. The space of pth Schatten-class operators is a Banach space with respect to the Schatten norm.

Via polar decomposition, one can prove that the space of pth Schatten class operators is an ideal in B(H). Furthermore, the Schatten norm satisfies a type of Hölder inequality:

$$\| S T\| _{S_1} \leq \| S\| _{S_p} \| T\| _{S_q} \ \mbox{if} \ S \in S_p , \  T\in S_q \mbox{  and  }  1/p+1/q=1.$$

If we denote by $S_\infty$ the Banach space of compact operators on H with respect to the operator norm, the above Hölder-type inequality even holds for $p \in [1,\infty]$. From this it follows that $\phi : S_p \rightarrow S_q '$, $T \mapsto \mathrm{tr}(T\cdot )$ is a well-defined contraction. (Here the prime denotes (topological) dual.)

Observe that the 2nd Schatten class is in fact the Hilbert space of Hilbert–Schmidt operators. Moreover, the 1st Schatten class is the space of trace class operators.
