= Matrix norm =

Norm on a vector space of matrices

In mathematics, a norm is a function from a vector space to non-negative real numbers that satisfies certain axioms. A matrix norm is a norm defined on a vector space of matrices. As for every norm, a matrix norm defines a distance, the distance between two matrices being the norm of their difference. The specificity of matrix norms is that they may often be defined either directly as for every norm, or by mean of their properties as linear operators.

There are many specific matrix norms. Most arise from the following three perspectives, though different perspectives may sometimes yield the same norm.

- Consider the matrix as a linear operator; then a matrix norm may describe how much the operator can stretch vectors. Such matrix norms induced by vector norms are called operator norms.
- Consider the matrix as a rectangular array of numbers; then a matrix norm may be defined as a function of the entries of the matrix. Such matrix norms are sometimes called "entry-wise" norms.
- The singular value decomposition is useful in analyzing matrices. A vector norm of the singular values of a matrix may be taken as a matrix norm. Such norms are called Schatten norms.

Matrix norms are often denoted by double vertical bars with optional subscripts (e.g., $\|A\|$ or $\|A\|_2$). However, the meaning of the subscript may vary, since matrix norms in different perspectives relate to $\ell^p$-norms in different ways.

Matrix norms in different perspectives
Operator norms	"Entry-wise" norms	Schatten norms	Also known as
induced from $\ell^1$-norm	maximum column sum		column norm
	sum of singular values	Schatten $\ell^1$-norm	nuclear norm
	square root of the sum of squares	Schatten $\ell^2$-norm	Frobenius norm
induced from $\ell^2$-norm	the largest singular value	Schatten $\ell^\infty$-norm	spectral norm
induced from $\ell^\infty$-norm	maximum row sum		row norm

== Preliminaries ==
Given a field $\ K\$ of either real or complex numbers (or any complete subset thereof), let $\ K^{m \times n}\$ be the K-vector space of matrices with $m$ rows and $n$ columns and entries in the field $\ K ~.$ A matrix norm is a norm on $\ K^{m \times n}~.$

The matrix norm is a function $\ \|\cdot\| : K^{m \times n} \to \R^{0+}\$ that must satisfy the following properties:

For all scalars $\ \alpha \in K\$ and matrices $\ A, B \in K^{m \times n}\ ,$

- $\|A\| \ge 0\$ (positive-valued)
- $\|A\| = 0 \iff A=0_{m,n}$ (definite)
- $\left\| \alpha\ A \right\| = \left| \alpha \right|\ \left\|A\right\|\$ (absolutely homogeneous)
- $\| A + B \| \le \| A \| + \| B \|\$ (sub-additive or satisfying the triangle inequality)

The only feature distinguishing matrices from rearranged vectors is multiplication. Matrix norms are particularly useful if they are also sub-multiplicative:

- $\ \left\| AB \right\| \le \left\| A \right\| \left\| B \right\|\$ (Note: The condition only applies when the product is defined, such as the case of square matrices ($\ m = n\$). More generally, multiplication of the matrices must be possible: $\ A \in K^{\ell \times m}\$ and $\ B \in K^{m \times n} ~;$ further, the two norms $\ \|A\|\$ and $\ \|B\|\$ must either have the same definitions, only differing in the matrix dimensions, or two different types of norms that are none the less "consistent" (see below).)

Every norm on $\ K^{n\times n}\$ can be rescaled to be sub-multiplicative; in some books, the terminology matrix norm is reserved for sub-multiplicative norms.

== Possible properties ==
=== Unitary invariance ===
A matrix norm is called unitarily invariant if for all unitary matrices $U,V$ and matrix $A$, $\lVert UAV \rVert = \lVert A \rVert$.

A symmetric gauge function is an absolute vector norm $\phi: \C^p \to \R^+$ such that $\phi(Px) = \phi(x)$ for any permutation matrix $P$. That is:

- Non-negativity: $\phi(x)\geq0$, and $\phi(x)=0$ if and only if $x=0$.
- Positive homogeneity: $\phi(\alpha x)=|\alpha|\phi(x)$ for any real number $\alpha$.
- Triangle inequality: $\phi(x+y)\leq \phi(x)+\phi(y)$.
- Symmetry: $\phi(Px) = \phi(x)$ for any permutation matrix $P$.

A norm is a unitarily invariant matrix norm if and only if it is a symmetric gauge function on the vector of singular values.

=== Consistent and compatible norms ===
A matrix norm $\| \cdot \|$ on $K^{m \times n}$ is called consistent with a vector norm $\| \cdot \|_{\alpha}$ on $K^n$ and a vector norm $\| \cdot \|_{\beta}$ on $K^m$, if:
$$\left\|Ax\right\|_{\beta} \leq \left\|A\right\| \left\|x\right\|_{\alpha}$$
for all $A \in K^{m \times n}$ and all $x \in K^n$. In the special case of m = n and $\alpha = \beta$, $\| \cdot \|$ is also called compatible with $\|\cdot \|_{\alpha}$.

All matrix norms induced by vector norms are consistent by definition. Also, any sub-multiplicative matrix norm on $K^{n \times n}$ induces a compatible vector norm on $K^n$ by defining $\left\| v \right\| := \left\| \left( v, v, \dots, v \right) \right\|$.

=== Monotone norms ===
A matrix norm $\|\cdot \|$ is called monotone if it is monotonic with respect to the Loewner order. Thus, a matrix norm is increasing if

$$A \preccurlyeq B \Rightarrow \|A\| \leq \|B\|.$$

The Frobenius norm and spectral norm are examples of monotone norms.

== Matrix norms induced by vector norms ==
Suppose a vector norm $\|\cdot\|_{\alpha}$ on $K^n$ and a vector norm $\|\cdot\|_{\beta}$ on $K^m$ are given. Any $m \times n$ matrix A induces a linear operator from $K^n$ to $K^m$ with respect to the standard basis, and one defines the corresponding induced norm or operator norm or subordinate norm on the space $K^{m \times n}$ of all $m \times n$ matrices as follows:
$$\|A\|_{\alpha, \beta} = \sup\{ \|Ax\|_\beta : x \in K^n \text{ such that } \|x\|_\alpha \leq 1 \}$$
where $\sup$ denotes the supremum. This norm measures how much the mapping induced by $A$ can stretch vectors. Depending on the vector norms $\|\cdot\|_{\alpha}$, $\|\cdot\|_{\beta}$ used, notation other than $\|\cdot\|_{\alpha,\beta}$ can be used for the operator norm.

=== Matrix norms induced by vector p-norms ===
If the p-norm for vectors ($1 \leq p \leq \infty$) is used for both spaces $K^n$ and $K^m,$ then the corresponding operator norm is:
$$\|A\|_p = \sup \{ \|Ax\|_p : x \in K^n \text{ such that } \|x\|_p \leq 1 \}.$$
These induced norms are different from the "entry-wise" p-norms and the Schatten p-norms for matrices treated below, which are also usually denoted by $\|A\|_p .$

Geometrically speaking, one can imagine a p-norm unit ball $V_{p, n} = \{x\in K^n : \|x\|_p \le 1 \}$ in $K^n$, then apply the linear map $A$ to the ball. It would end up becoming a distorted convex shape $AV_{p, n} \subset K^m$, and $\|A\|_p$ measures the longest "radius" of the distorted convex shape. In other words, we must take a p-norm unit ball $V_{p, m}$ in $K^m$, then multiply it by at least $\|A\|_p$, in order for it to be large enough to contain $AV_{p, n}$.

==== p = 1 or ∞ ====
When $\ p = 1\ ,$ or $\ p = \infty\ ,$ we have simple formulas.

$$\|A\|_1 = \max_{1 \leq j \leq n} \sum_{i=1}^m \left| a_{ij} \right|\ ,$$

which is simply the maximum absolute column sum of the matrix.
$$\|A\|_\infty = \max_{1 \leq i \leq m} \sum _{j=1}^n \left| a_{ij} \right|\ ,$$
which is simply the maximum absolute row sum of the matrix.

For example, for
$$A = \begin{bmatrix} -3 & 5 & 7 \\ ~~2 & 6 & 4 \\ ~~0 & 2 & 8 \\ \end{bmatrix}\ ,$$
we have that
$$\|A\|_1 = \max\bigl\{\ |{-3}|+2+0\ ,~ 5+6+2\ ,~ 7+4+8\ \bigr\} = \max\bigl\{\ 5\ ,~ 13\ ,~ 19\ \bigr\} = 19\ ,$$
$$\|A\|_\infty = \max\bigl\{\ |{-3}|+5+7\ ,~ 2+6+4\ ,~ 0+2+8\ \bigr\} = \max\bigl\{\ 15\ ,~ 12\ ,~ 10\ \bigr\} = 15 ~.$$

==== Spectral norm (p = 2) ====
When $p = 2$ (the Euclidean norm or $\ell_2$-norm for vectors), the induced matrix norm is the spectral norm. The spectral norm should not be confused with the spectral radius. The two values do not coincide in infinite dimensions — see Spectral radius for further discussion. The spectral norm of a matrix $A$ is the largest singular value of $A$, i.e., the square root of the largest eigenvalue of the matrix $A^*A,$ where $A^*$ denotes the conjugate transpose of $A$:
$$\|A\|_2 = \sqrt{\lambda_{\max}\left(A^* A\right)} = \sigma_{\max}(A).$$
where $\sigma_{\max}(A)$ represents the largest singular value of matrix $A.$

There are further properties:

- $\|A \|_2 = \sup\{x^* A y : x \in K^m, y \in K^n \text{ with }\|x\|_2 = \|y\|_2 = 1\}.$ Proved by the Cauchy–Schwarz inequality.
- $\| A^* A\|_2 = \| A A^* \|_2 = \|A\|_2^2$. Proven by singular value decomposition (SVD) on $A$.
- $\|A\| _2 = \sigma_{\mathrm{max}}(A) \leq \|A\|_{\rm F} = \sqrt{\sum_i \sigma_{i}(A)^2}$, where $\|A\|_\textrm{F}$ is the Frobenius norm. Equality holds if and only if the matrix $A$ is a rank-one matrix or a zero matrix.
- Conversely, $\|A\|_\textrm{F} \leq \min(m,n)^{1/2}\|A\|_2$.
- $\|A\|_2 = \sqrt{\rho(A^{*}A)}\leq\sqrt{\|A^{*}A\|_\infty}\leq\sqrt{\|A\|_1\|A\|_\infty}$.

=== Matrix norms induced by vector α- and β-norms ===
We can generalize the above definition. Suppose we have vector norms $\|\cdot\|_{\alpha}$ and $\|\cdot\|_{\beta}$ for spaces $K^n$ and $K^m$ respectively; the corresponding operator norm is
$$\|A\|_{\alpha, \beta} = \sup\{ \|Ax\|_\beta : x \in K^n \text{ such that } \|x\|_\alpha \leq 1 \}$$
In particular, the $\|A\|_{p}$ defined previously is the special case of $\|A\|_{p, p}$.

In the special cases of $\alpha = 2$ and $\beta=\infty$, the induced matrix norms can be computed by
$$\|A\|_{2,\infty}= \max_{1\le i\le m}\|A_{i:}\|_2,$$
where $A_{i:}$ is the i-th row of matrix $A$.

In the special cases of $\alpha = 1$ and $\beta=2$, the induced matrix norms can be computed by
$$\|A\|_{1, 2} = \max_{1\le j\le n}\|A_{:j}\|_2,$$
where $A_{:j}$ is the j-th column of matrix $A$.

Hence, $\|A\|_{2,\infty}$ and $\|A\|_{1, 2}$ are the maximum row and column 2-norm of the matrix, respectively.

=== Properties ===
Any operator norm is consistent with the vector norms that induce it, giving
$$\|Ax\|_\beta \leq \|A\|_{\alpha,\beta}\|x\|_\alpha.$$

Suppose $\|\cdot\|_{\alpha,\beta}$; $\|\cdot\|_{\beta,\gamma}$; and $\|\cdot\|_{\alpha,\gamma}$ are operator norms induced by the respective pairs of vector norms $(\|\cdot\|_\alpha, \|\cdot\|_\beta)$; $(\|\cdot\|_\beta, \|\cdot\|_{\gamma})$; and $(\|\cdot\|_\alpha, \|\cdot\|_\gamma)$. Then,

$$\|AB\|_{\alpha,\gamma} \leq \|A\|_{\beta, \gamma} \|B\|_{\alpha, \beta} ;$$

this follows from
$$\|ABx\|_\gamma \leq \|A\|_{\beta, \gamma} \|Bx\|_\beta \leq \|A\|_{\beta, \gamma} \|B\|_{\alpha, \beta} \|x\|_\alpha$$
and
$$\sup_{\|x\|_\alpha = 1} \|ABx \|_\gamma = \|AB\|_{\alpha, \gamma} .$$

=== Square matrices ===
Suppose $\|\cdot\|_{\alpha, \alpha}$ is an operator norm on the space of square matrices $K^{n \times n}$ induced by vector norms $\|\cdot\|_{\alpha}$ and $\|\cdot\|_\alpha$. Then, the operator norm is a sub-multiplicative matrix norm:
$$\|AB\|_{\alpha, \alpha} \leq \|A\|_{\alpha, \alpha} \|B\|_{\alpha, \alpha}.$$

Moreover, any such norm satisfies the inequality

$$(\|A^r\|_{\alpha, \alpha})^{1/r} \ge \rho(A)$$	1

for all positive integers r, where ρ(A) is the spectral radius of A. For symmetric or hermitian A, we have equality in (1) for the 2-norm, since in this case the 2-norm is precisely the spectral radius of A. For an arbitrary matrix, we may not have equality for any norm; a counterexample would be
$$A = \begin{bmatrix} 0 & 1 \\ 0 & 0 \end{bmatrix},$$
which has vanishing spectral radius. In any case, for any matrix norm, we have the spectral radius formula:
$$\lim_{r\to\infty}\|A^r\|^{1/r}=\rho(A).$$

=== Energy norms ===
If the vector norms $\|\cdot\|_{\alpha}$ and $\|\cdot\|_{\beta}$ are given in terms of energy norms based on symmetric positive definite matrices $P$ and $Q$ respectively, the resulting operator norm is given as
$$\|A\|_{P, Q} = \sup \{ \|Ax\|_Q : \|x\|_P \leq 1 \}.$$

Using the symmetric matrix square roots of $P$ and $Q$ respectively, the operator norm can be expressed as the spectral norm of a modified matrix:

$$\|A\|_{P, Q} = \|Q^{1/2} A P^{-1/2}\|_{2}.$$

== "Entry-wise" matrix norms ==
These norms treat an $m \times n$ matrix as a vector of size $m \cdot n$, and use one of the familiar vector norms. For example, using the p-norm for vectors, p ≥ 1, we get:

$$\| A \|_{p,p} = \| \mathrm{vec}(A) \|_p = \left( \sum_{i=1}^m \sum_{j=1}^n |a_{ij}|^p \right)^{1/p}$$

This is a different norm from the induced p-norm (see above) and the Schatten p-norm (see below), but the notation is the same.

The special case p = 2 is the Frobenius norm, and p = ∞ yields the maximum norm.

=== L_{2,1} and L_{p,q} norms ===
Let $(a_1, \ldots, a_n)$ be the dimension m columns of matrix $A$. From the original definition, the matrix $A$ presents n data points in an m-dimensional space. The $L_{2,1}$ norm is the sum of the Euclidean norms of the columns of the matrix:

$$\| A \|_{2,1} = \sum_{j=1}^n \| a_{j} \|_2 = \sum_{j=1}^n \left( \sum_{i=1}^m |a_{ij}|^2 \right)^{1/2}$$

The $L_{2,1}$ norm as a loss function is more robust, since the error for each data point (a column) is not squared. It is used in robust data analysis and sparse coding.

For p, q ≥ 1, the $L_{2,1}$ norm can be generalized to the $L_{p,q}$ norm as follows:

$$\| A \|_{p,q} =  \left(\sum_{j=1}^n \left( \sum_{i=1}^m |a_{ij}|^p \right)^{\frac{q}{p}}\right)^{\frac{1}{q}}.$$

=== Frobenius norm ===
When p = q = 2 for the $L_{p,q}$ norm, it is called the Frobenius norm or the Hilbert–Schmidt norm, though the latter term is used more frequently in the context of operators on (possibly infinite-dimensional) Hilbert space. This norm can be defined in various ways:

$$\|A\|_\text{F} = \sqrt{\sum_{i}^m\sum_{j}^n |a_{ij}|^2} = \sqrt{\operatorname{trace}\left(A^* A\right)} = \sqrt{\sum_{i=1}^{\min\{m, n\}} \sigma_i^2(A)},$$

where the trace is the sum of diagonal entries, and $\sigma_i(A)$ are the singular values of $A$. The second equality is proven by explicit computation of $\mathrm{trace}(A^*A)$. The third equality is proven by singular value decomposition of $A$, and the fact that the trace is invariant under circular shifts.

The Frobenius norm is an extension of the Euclidean norm to $K^{n \times n}$ and comes from the Frobenius inner product on the space of all matrices.

The Frobenius norm is sub-multiplicative and is very useful for numerical linear algebra. The sub-multiplicativity of Frobenius norm can be proved using the Cauchy–Schwarz inequality. In fact, it is more than sub-multiplicative, as
$$\|AB\|_F \leq\|A\|_{op}\|B\|_F$$
where the operator norm $\|\cdot\|_{op} \leq \|\cdot\|_{F}$.

Frobenius norm is often easier to compute than induced norms, and has the useful property of being invariant under rotations (and unitary operations in general). That is, $\|A\|_\text{F} = \|AU\|_\text{F} = \|UA\|_\text{F}$ for any unitary matrix $U$. This property follows from the cyclic nature of the trace ($\operatorname{trace}(XYZ) =\operatorname{trace}(YZX) = \operatorname{trace}(ZXY)$):

$$\|AU\|_\text{F}^2 = \operatorname{trace}\left( (AU)^{*}A U \right)
= \operatorname{trace}\left( U^{*} A^{*}A U \right)
= \operatorname{trace}\left( UU^{*} A^{*}A \right)
= \operatorname{trace}\left( A^{*} A \right)
= \|A\|_\text{F}^2,$$

and analogously:

$$\|UA\|_\text{F}^2 = \operatorname{trace}\left( (UA)^{*}UA \right)
= \operatorname{trace}\left( A^{*} U^{*} UA  \right)
= \operatorname{trace}\left( A^{*}A \right)
= \|A\|_\text{F}^2,$$

where we have used the unitary nature of $U$ (that is, $U^* U = U U^* = \mathbf{I}$).

It also satisfies

$$\|A^* A\|_\text{F} = \|AA^*\|_\text{F} \leq \|A\|_\text{F}^2$$

and

$$\|A + B\|_\text{F}^2 = \|A\|_\text{F}^2 + \|B\|_\text{F}^2 + 2 \operatorname{Re} \left( \langle A, B \rangle_\text{F} \right),$$

where $\langle A, B \rangle_\text{F}$ is the Frobenius inner product, and Re is the real part of a complex number (irrelevant for real matrices)

=== Max norm ===
The max norm is the elementwise norm in the limit as p = q goes to infinity:

$$\|A\|_{\max} = \max_{i, j} |a_{ij}|.$$

This norm is not sub-multiplicative; but modifying the right-hand side to $\sqrt{m n} \max_{i, j} \vert a_{i j} \vert$ makes it so.

Note that in some literature (such as Communication complexity), an alternative definition of max-norm, also called the $\gamma_2$-norm, refers to the factorization norm:

$$\gamma_2(A) = \min_{U,V: A = UV^T} \| U \|_{2,\infty} \| V \|_{2,\infty} =  \min_{U,V: A = UV^T} \max_{i,j} \| U_{i,:} \|_2 \| V_{j,:} \|_2$$

== Schatten norms ==
The Schatten p-norms arise when applying the p-norm to the vector of singular values of a matrix. If the singular values of the $m \times n$ matrix $A$ are denoted by σ_{i}, then the Schatten p-norm is defined by

$$\|A\|_p = \left( \sum_{i=1}^{\min\{m,n\}} \sigma_i^p(A) \right)^{1/p}.$$

These norms again share the notation with the induced and entry-wise p-norms, but they are different.

All Schatten norms are sub-multiplicative. They are also unitarily invariant, which means that $\|A\| = \|UAV\|$ for all matrices $A$ and all unitary matrices $U$ and $V$.

The most familiar cases are p = 1, 2, ∞. The case p = 2 yields the Frobenius norm, introduced before. The case p = ∞ yields the spectral norm, which is the operator norm induced by the vector 2-norm (see above). Finally, p = 1 yields the nuclear norm (also known as the trace norm, or the Ky Fan 'n'-norm), defined as:

$$\|A\|_{*} = \operatorname{trace} \left(\sqrt{A^*A}\right) = \sum_{i=1}^{\min\{m,n\}} \sigma_i(A),$$

where $\sqrt{A^*A}$ denotes a positive semidefinite matrix $B$ such that $BB=A^*A$. More precisely, since $A^*A$ is a positive semidefinite matrix, its square root is well defined. The nuclear norm $\|A\|_{*}$ is a convex envelope of the rank function $\text{rank}(A)$, so it is often used in mathematical optimization to search for low-rank matrices.

Combining von Neumann's trace inequality with Hölder's inequality for Euclidean space yields a version of Hölder's inequality for Schatten norms for $1/p + 1/q = 1$:

$$\left|\operatorname{trace}(A^*B)\right| \le \|A\|_p \|B\|_q,$$

In particular, this implies the Schatten norm inequality

$$\|A\|_F^2 \le \|A\|_p \|A\|_q.$$

== Cut norms ==
Another source of inspiration for matrix norms arises from considering a matrix as the adjacency matrix of a weighted, directed graph. The so-called "cut norm" measures how close the associated graph is to being bipartite:
$$\|A\|_{\Box}=\max_{S\subseteq[n], T\subseteq[m]}{\left|\sum_{s\in S,t\in T}{A_{t,s}}\right|}$$
where A ∈ K^{m×n}. Equivalent definitions (up to a constant factor) impose the conditions 2|S| > n & 2|T| > m; S = T; or S ∩ T = ∅.

The cut-norm is equivalent to the induced operator norm ‖·‖_{∞→1}, which is itself equivalent to another norm, called the Grothendieck norm.

To define the Grothendieck norm, first note that a linear operator K^{1} → K^{1} is just a scalar, and thus extends to a linear operator on any K^{k} → K^{k}. Moreover, given any choice of basis for K^{n} and K^{m}, any linear operator K^{n} → K^{m} extends to a linear operator (K^{k})^{n} → (K^{k})^{m}, by letting each matrix element on elements of K^{k} via scalar multiplication. The Grothendieck norm is the norm of that extended operator; in symbols:
$$\|A\|_{G,k}=\sup_{\text{each } u_j, v_j\in K^k; \|u_j\| = \|v_j\| = 1}{\sum_{j \in [n], \ell \in [m]}{(u_j\cdot v_j) A_{\ell,j}}}$$

The Grothendieck norm depends on choice of basis (usually taken to be the standard basis) and k.

== Equivalence of norms ==
For any two matrix norms $\|\cdot\|_{\alpha}$ and $\|\cdot\|_{\beta}$, we have that:

$$r\|A\|_\alpha\leq\|A\|_\beta\leq s\|A\|_\alpha$$

for some positive numbers r and s, for all matrices $A\in K^{m \times n}$. In other words, all norms on $K^{m \times n}$ are equivalent; they induce the same topology on $K^{m \times n}$. This is true because the vector space $K^{m \times n}$ has the finite dimension $m \times n$.

Moreover, for every matrix norm $\|\cdot\|$ on $\R^{n\times n}$ there exists a unique positive real number $k$ such that $\ell\|\cdot\|$ is a sub-multiplicative matrix norm for every $\ell \ge k$; to wit,

$$k = \sup\{\Vert A B \Vert \,:\, \Vert A \Vert \leq 1, \Vert B \Vert \leq 1\}.$$

A sub-multiplicative matrix norm $\|\cdot\|_{\alpha}$ is said to be minimal, if there exists no other sub-multiplicative matrix norm $\|\cdot\|_{\beta}$ satisfying $\|\cdot\|_{\beta} < \|\cdot\|_{\alpha}$.

=== Examples of norm equivalence ===
Let $\|A\|_p$ once again refer to the norm induced by the vector p-norm (as above in the Induced norm section).

For matrix $A\in\R^{m\times n}$ of rank $r$, the following inequalities hold:

- $\|A\|_2\le\|A\|_F\le\sqrt{r}\|A\|_2$
- $\|A\|_F \le \|A\|_{*} \le \sqrt{r} \|A\|_F$
- $\|A\|_{\max} \le \|A\|_2 \le \sqrt{mn}\|A\|_{\max}$
- $\frac{1}{\sqrt{n}}\|A\|_\infty\le\|A\|_2\le\sqrt{m}\|A\|_\infty$
- $\frac{1}{\sqrt{m}}\|A\|_1\le\|A\|_2\le\sqrt{n}\|A\|_1.$

== See also ==
- Dual norm
- Logarithmic norm

== Bibliography ==
- James W. Demmel, Applied Numerical Linear Algebra, section 1.7, published by SIAM, 1997.
- Carl D. Meyer, Matrix Analysis and Applied Linear Algebra, published by SIAM, 2000.
- John Watrous, Theory of Quantum Information, 2.3 Norms of operators, lecture notes, University of Waterloo, 2011.
- Kendall Atkinson, An Introduction to Numerical Analysis, published by John Wiley & Sons, Inc 1989
