= Identity matrix =

Square matrix with ones on the main diagonal and zeros elsewhere

Example of a 3x3 identity matrix

In linear algebra, the identity matrix of size $n$ is the $n\times n$ square matrix with ones on the main diagonal and zeros elsewhere. It has unique properties; for example when the identity matrix represents a geometric transformation, the object remains unchanged by the transformation. In other contexts, it is analogous to multiplying by the number 1.

== Terminology and notation ==
The identity matrix is often denoted by $I_n$, or simply by $I$ if the size is immaterial or can be trivially determined by the context.

$$I_1 = \begin{bmatrix} 1 \end{bmatrix}
,\
I_2 = \begin{bmatrix}
1 & 0 \\
0 & 1 \end{bmatrix}
,\
I_3 = \begin{bmatrix}
1 & 0 & 0 \\
0 & 1 & 0 \\
0 & 0 & 1 \end{bmatrix}
,\ \dots ,\
I_n = \begin{bmatrix}
1 & 0 & 0 & \cdots & 0 \\
0 & 1 & 0 & \cdots & 0 \\
0 & 0 & 1 & \cdots & 0 \\
\vdots & \vdots & \vdots & \ddots & \vdots \\
0 & 0 & 0 & \cdots & 1 \end{bmatrix}.$$

The term unit matrix has also been widely used, but the term identity matrix is now standard. The term unit matrix is ambiguous, because it is also used for a matrix of ones and for any unit of the ring of all $n\times n$ matrices.

In some fields, such as group theory or quantum mechanics, the identity matrix is sometimes denoted by a boldface one, $\mathbf{1}$, or called "id" (short for identity). Less frequently, some mathematics books use $U$ or $E$ to represent the identity matrix, standing for "unit matrix" and the German word Einheitsmatrix respectively.

In terms of a notation that is sometimes used to concisely describe diagonal matrices, the identity matrix can be written as
$$I_n = \operatorname{diag}(1, 1, \dots, 1).$$
The identity matrix can also be written using the Kronecker delta notation:
$$(I_n)_{ij} = \delta_{ij}.$$

== Properties ==
When $A$ is an $m\times n$ matrix, it is a property of matrix multiplication that
$$I_m A = A I_n = A.$$
In particular, the identity matrix serves as the multiplicative identity of the matrix ring of all $n\times n$ matrices, and as the identity element of the general linear group $\mathrm{GL}(n)$, which consists of all invertible $n\times n$ matrices under the matrix multiplication operation. In particular, the identity matrix is invertible. It is an involutory matrix, equal to its own inverse. In this group, two square matrices have the identity matrix as their product exactly when they are the inverses of each other.

When $n\times n$ matrices are used to represent linear transformations from an $n$-dimensional vector space to itself, the identity matrix $I_n$ represents the identity function, for whatever basis was used in this representation.

The $i$th column of an identity matrix is the unit vector $e_i$, a vector whose $i$th entry is 1 and 0 elsewhere. The determinant of the identity matrix is 1, and its trace is $n$.

The identity matrix is the only idempotent matrix with non-zero determinant. That is, it is the only matrix such that:

1. When multiplied by itself, the result is itself
2. All of its rows and columns are linearly independent.

The principal square root of an identity matrix is itself, and this is its only positive-definite square root. However, every identity matrix with at least two rows and columns has an infinitude of symmetric square roots.

The rank of an identity matrix $I_n$ equals the size $n$, i.e.:
$$\operatorname{rank}(I_n) = n .$$

== See also ==
- Binary matrix (zero-one matrix)
- Elementary matrix
- Exchange matrix
- Matrix of ones
- Pauli matrices (the identity matrix is the zeroth Pauli matrix)
- Householder transformation (the Householder matrix is built through the identity matrix)
- Square root of a 2 by 2 identity matrix
- Unitary matrix
- Zero matrix
