= Partial isometry =

In functional analysis, a partial isometry is a linear map between Hilbert spaces such that it is an isometry on the orthogonal complement of its kernel.

The orthogonal complement of its kernel is called the initial subspace and its range is called the final subspace.

Partial isometries appear in the polar decomposition.

== General definition ==
The concept of partial isometry can be defined in other equivalent ways. If U is an isometric map defined on a closed subset H_{1} of a Hilbert space H then we can define an extension W of U to all of H by the condition that W be zero on the orthogonal complement of H_{1}. Thus a partial isometry is also sometimes defined as a closed partially defined isometric map.

Partial isometries (and projections) can be defined in the more abstract setting of a semigroup with involution; the definition coincides with the one herein.

== Characterization in finite dimensions ==
In finite-dimensional vector spaces, a matrix $A$ is a partial isometry if and only if $A^* A$ is the projection onto its support. Contrast this with the more demanding definition of isometry: a matrix $V$ is an isometry if and only if $V^* V=I$. In other words, an isometry is an injective partial isometry.

Any finite-dimensional partial isometry can be represented, in some choice of basis, as a matrix of the form
$$A=\begin{pmatrix}V & 0\end{pmatrix}$$
, that is, as a matrix whose first $\operatorname{rank}(A)$ columns form an isometry, while all the other columns are identically 0.

Note that for any isometry $V$, the Hermitian conjugate $V^*$ is a partial isometry, although not every partial isometry has this form, as shown explicitly in the given examples.

== Operator Algebras ==
For operator algebras, one introduces the initial and final subspaces:

$$\mathcal{I}W:=\mathcal{R}W^*W,\,\mathcal{F}W:=\mathcal{R}WW^*$$

== C*-Algebras ==
For C*-algebras, one has the chain of equivalences due to the C*-property:

$$(W^*W)^2 = W^*W \iff WW^*W = W \iff W^*WW^* = W^* \iff (WW^*)^2 = WW^*$$

So one defines partial isometries by either of the above and declares the initial resp. final projection to be W*W resp. WW*.

A pair of projections are partitioned by the equivalence relation:

$$P = W^*W,\,Q = WW^*$$

It plays an important role in K-theory for C*-algebras and in the Murray-von Neumann theory of projections in a von Neumann algebra.

== Special Classes ==
=== Projections ===
Any orthogonal projection is one with common initial and final subspace:

$$P:\mathcal{H}\rightarrow\mathcal{H}:\quad\mathcal{I}P=\mathcal{F}P$$

=== Embeddings ===
Any isometric embedding is one with full initial subspace:

$$J:\mathcal{H}\hookrightarrow\mathcal{K}:\quad\mathcal{I}J=\mathcal{H}$$

=== Unitaries ===
Any unitary operator is one with full initial and final subspace:

$$U:\mathcal{H}\leftrightarrow\mathcal{K}:\quad\mathcal{I}U=\mathcal{H},\,\mathcal{F}U=\mathcal{K}$$

(Apart from these there are far more partial isometries.)

== Examples ==
=== Nilpotents ===
On the two-dimensional complex Hilbert space the matrix

$$\begin{pmatrix}0 & 1 \\ 0 & 0 \end{pmatrix}$$

is a partial isometry with initial subspace

$$\{0\} \oplus \mathbb{C}$$

and final subspace

$$\mathbb{C} \oplus \{0\}.$$

=== Generic finite-dimensional examples ===
Other possible examples in finite dimensions are
$$A\equiv \begin{pmatrix}1&0&0\\0&\frac1{\sqrt2}&\frac1{\sqrt2}\\0&0&0\end{pmatrix}.$$
This is clearly not an isometry, because the columns are not orthonormal. However, its support is the span of $\mathbf e_1\equiv (1,0,0)$ and $\frac{1}{\sqrt2}(\mathbf e_2+\mathbf e_3)\equiv (0,1/\sqrt2,1/\sqrt2)$, and restricting the action of $A$ on this space, it becomes an isometry (and in particular, a unitary). One can similarly verify that $A^* A = \Pi_{\operatorname{supp}(A)}$, that is, that $A^* A$ is the projection onto its support.

Partial isometries do not necessarily correspond to squared matrices. Consider for example,
$$A\equiv \begin{pmatrix}1&0&0\\0&\frac12&\frac12\\ 0 & 0 & 0 \\ 0& \frac12 & \frac12\end{pmatrix}.$$
This matrix has support the span of $\mathbf e_1\equiv (1,0,0)$ and $\mathbf e_2+\mathbf e_3\equiv (0,1,1)$, and acts as an isometry (and in particular, as the identity) on this space.

Yet another example, in which this time $A$ acts like a non-trivial isometry on its support, is
$$A = \begin{pmatrix}0 & \frac1{\sqrt2} & \frac1{\sqrt2} \\ 1&0&0\\0&0&0\end{pmatrix}.$$
One can readily verify that $A\mathbf e_1=\mathbf e_2$, and $A \left(\frac{\mathbf e_2 + \mathbf e_3}{\sqrt2}\right) = \mathbf e_1$, showing the isometric behavior of $A$ between its support $\operatorname{span}(\{\mathbf e_1, \mathbf e_2+\mathbf e_3\})$ and its range $\operatorname{span}(\{\mathbf e_1,\mathbf e_2\})$.

=== Leftshift and Rightshift ===
On the square summable sequences, the operators

$$R: \ell^2(\mathbb{N}) \to \ell^2(\mathbb{N}): (x_1,x_2,\ldots) \mapsto (0,x_1,x_2,\ldots)$$

$$L: \ell^2(\mathbb{N}) \to \ell^2(\mathbb{N}): (x_1,x_2,\ldots) \mapsto (x_2,x_3,\ldots)$$

which are related by

$$R^* = L$$

are partial isometries with initial subspace

$$LR(x_1,x_2,\ldots)=(x_1,x_2,\ldots)$$

and final subspace:

$$RL(x_1,x_2,\ldots)=(0,x_2,\ldots)$$.
