= Square root of a matrix =

Matrix B such that B² equals a given matrix A

In mathematics, the square root of a matrix extends the notion of square root from numbers to matrices. A matrix B is said to be a square root of A if the matrix product BB is equal to A.

Some authors use the name square root or the notation A^{1/2} only for the specific case when A is positive semidefinite, to denote the unique matrix B that is positive semidefinite and such that BB = A.

Less frequently, the name square root may be used for any factorization of a positive semidefinite matrix A as B^{T}B = A, as in the Cholesky factorization, even if BB ≠ A. This distinct meaning is discussed in the article Definite matrix § Decomposition.

== Examples ==
In general, a matrix can have several square roots. In particular, if $A = B^2$ then $A = (-B)^2$ as well.

For example, the $2 \times 2$ identity matrix
$$\textstyle\begin{bmatrix}1 & 0\\ 0 & 1\end{bmatrix}$$
has infinitely many square roots. They are given by

$$\begin{bmatrix} \pm 1 & ~~0\\ ~~0 & \pm 1\end{bmatrix}\$$
and
$$\ \begin{bmatrix} a & ~~b\\ c & -a\end{bmatrix}$$

where $(a, b, c)$ are any numbers (real or complex) such that $a^2 + bc = 1$.

In particular, if $\ (r,s,t)\$ is any Pythagorean triple, (Note: A Pythagorean triple is any triplet of positive integers such that $\ r^2 + s^2 = t^2$.) then
$$\ \frac{1}{t}\begin{bmatrix}r & ~~s\\ s & -r\end{bmatrix}\$$
is one of the matrix square roots of $\ I_{2}\$ which happens to be symmetric and has rational entries. Thus

$$\begin{bmatrix}1 & 0\\ 0 & 1\end{bmatrix} = \begin{bmatrix}0 & 1\\ 1 & 0\end{bmatrix}^2 = \begin{bmatrix}\frac{4}{5} & ~~\frac{3}{5}\\ \frac{3}{5} & -\frac{4}{5}\end{bmatrix}^2$$.

Minus $I_2$ also has square roots, for example:

$$-\begin{bmatrix} 1 & 0\\ 0 & 1 \end{bmatrix} = \begin{bmatrix} 0 & -1 \\ 1 & ~~0 \end{bmatrix}^2$$,

which can be used to represent the imaginary unit $\ i\$ and hence all complex numbers using $2 \times 2$ real matrices; see matrix representation of complex numbers.

As with the real numbers, a real matrix may fail to have a real square root, but may have a square root with complex-valued entries. But some matrices have no square root. An example is the matrix
$$\ \begin{bmatrix}0 & 1\\ 0 & 0\end{bmatrix}$$.

Notice that some ideas from number theory do not carry over to matrices: The square root of a nonnegative integer must either be another integer or an irrational number, excluding non-integer rationals. Contrast that to a matrix of integers, which can have a square root whose entries are all non-integer rational numbers, as demonstrated in some of the above examples.

== Positive semidefinite matrices ==
A symmetric real $n \times n$ matrix $A$ is called positive semidefinite if $x^\mathsf{T} \! A \, x \geq 0$ for all $x \in \R^n$ (here $x^\mathsf{T}$ denotes the transpose of $x$, changing a column vector into a row vector).

A square real matrix $A$ is positive semidefinite if and only if $A = B^\mathsf{T} B$ for some matrix $B$. There can be many different such matrices $B$. A positive semidefinite matrix $A$ can also have many matrices $B$ such that $A = B B$. However, $A$ always has precisely one square root $B$ that is both positive semidefinite and symmetric. In particular, since $B$ is required to be symmetric, $B = B^\mathsf{T}$, so the two conditions $A = B B$ or $A = B^\mathsf{T} B$ are equivalent.

For complex-valued matrices, the conjugate transpose $B^*$ is used instead of the transpose $B^\mathsf{T}$, and the matrices $A$ which are positive semidefinite over $\C^n$ are necessarily Hermitian, the latter meaning $A^* = A$.

Theorem— Let $A$ be a positive semidefinite real matrix that is also symmetric. (Note: Note that positive semidefinite real matrices can be asymmetric; so the symmetry condition is a necessary, distinct requirement. For example, the real matrix $$A = \begin{bmatrix} 2 & 1 \\ -1 & 4 \end{bmatrix}$$ is not symmetric, but: For any real vector $$x = \begin{bmatrix} x_1 \\ x_2 \end{bmatrix}$$, $$\begin{align} x^\mathsf{T} \! A \, x &= \begin{bmatrix} x_1 & x_2 \end{bmatrix} \begin{bmatrix} 2 & 1 \\ -1 & 4 \end{bmatrix} \begin{bmatrix} x_1 \\ x_2 \end{bmatrix} \\ &= x_1 (2x_1 + x_2) + x_2 (-x_1 + 4x_2) \\ &= 2x_1^2 + 4x_2^2; \end{align}$$ so, for any non-zero real vector $x$, we have $x^\mathsf{T} \! A \, x > 0$; that is, $A$ is positive definite. Remark: This is because the symmetric part of $A$, $$S = (A + A^\mathsf{T})/2 = \begin{bmatrix} 2 & 0 \\ 0 & 4 \end{bmatrix}$$, has only positive eigenvalues (namely, $2$ and $4$).) Then there is exactly one positive semidefinite and symmetric matrix $B$ such that $A = B B$. (Note: There can be more than one non-symmetric and positive semidefinite matrix $B$ such that $A = B^\mathsf{T} B$.)

This unique matrix is called the principal, non-negative, or positive square root (the latter in the case of a positive definite matrix).

The principal square root of a real positive semidefinite matrix is real. The principal square root of a positive definite matrix is positive definite; more generally, the rank of the principal square root of $A$ is the same as the rank of $A$.

The operation of taking the principal square root is continuous on this set of matrices. These properties are consequences of the holomorphic functional calculus applied to matrices. The existence and uniqueness of the principal square root can be deduced directly from the Jordan normal form (see below).

== Matrices with distinct eigenvalues ==
An n×n matrix with n distinct non-zero eigenvalues has 2^{n} square roots. Such a matrix, A, has an eigendecomposition VDV^{−1}, where V is the matrix whose columns are eigenvectors of A and D is the diagonal matrix whose diagonal elements are the corresponding n eigenvalues λ_{i}. Thus the square roots of A are given by VD^{1/2} V^{−1}, where D^{1/2} is any square root matrix of D, which, for distinct eigenvalues, must be diagonal with diagonal elements equal to square roots of the diagonal elements of D; since there are two possible choices for a square root of each diagonal element of D, there are 2^{n} choices for the matrix D^{1/2}.

This also leads to a proof of the above observation, that a positive-definite matrix has precisely one positive-definite square root: a positive definite matrix has only positive eigenvalues, and each of these eigenvalues has only one positive square root; and since the eigenvalues of the square root matrix are the diagonal elements of D^{1/2}, for the square root matrix to be itself positive definite necessitates the use of only the unique positive square roots of the original eigenvalues.

== Solutions in closed form ==
If a matrix is idempotent, meaning $A^2 = A$, then by definition one of its square roots is the matrix $A$ itself.

=== Diagonal matrices ===
If $D$ is a diagonal $n \times n$ matrix $D = \operatorname{diag}(\lambda_1,\dots,\lambda_n)$, then some of its square roots are the diagonal matrices $\operatorname{diag}(\mu_1,\dots,\mu_n)$ where $\mu_i = \pm \sqrt{\lambda_i}$.

If the diagonal elements of $D$ are real and non-negative, then $D$ is positive semidefinite; and if the square roots are taken with the (+) sign (i.e., all non-negative), then the resulting matrix is the principal square root of $D$.

A diagonal matrix may have additional non-diagonal square roots if some entries on its diagonal are equal, as exemplified by the identity matrix above.

=== Upper triangular matrices ===
If $U$ is an upper triangular matrix (meaning its entries are $u_{i,j} = 0$ for $i > j \,$) and at most one of its diagonal entries is zero, then one upper triangular solution of the equation $B^2 = U$ can be found as follows.

Since the equation $u_{i,i} = b_{i,i}^2$ should be satisfied, let $b_{i,i}$ be the principal square root of the complex number $u_{i,i}$. This implies $b_{i,i} + b_{j,j} \neq 0$ for all $i, j$, because the principal square roots of complex numbers all lie on one half of the complex plane. (Note: More precisely, on the open right half-plane (with Cartesian inequation $x > 0$), together with the non-negative imaginary axis ($x = 0$ and $y \geq 0$).) This is possible with the assumption $b_{i,i}^2 = 0$ for at most one $i$.

From the equation
$$u_{i,j} = b_{i,i} b_{i,j} + b_{i,i+1} b_{i+1,j} + b_{i,i+2} b_{i+2,j} + \dots + b_{i,j-1} b_{j-1,j} + b_{i,j} b_{j,j},$$
we deduce that $b_{i,j}$ can be computed recursively for $j-i$ increasing from $1$ to $n - 1$ as:
$$b_{i,j} = \frac{ u_{i,j} - b_{i,i+1} b_{i+1,j} - b_{i,i+2} b_{i+2,j} - \dots - b_{i,j-1} b_{j-1,j} }{ b_{i,i} + b_{j,j} }.$$

If $U$ is upper triangular but has multiple zeroes on the diagonal, then a square root might not exist, as exemplified by $\left(\begin{smallmatrix}0 & 1\\ 0 & 0\end{smallmatrix}\right)$.

Note that the diagonal entries of a triangular matrix are precisely its eigenvalues (see Properties of a triangular matrix).

=== By diagonalization ===
An n × n matrix A is diagonalizable if there is a matrix V and a diagonal matrix D such that A = VDV^{−1}. This happens if and only if A has n eigenvectors which constitute a basis for $\C^n$. In this case, V can be chosen to be the matrix with the n eigenvectors as columns, and thus a square root of A is

$R = V S V^{-1}$,

where S is any square root of D. Indeed,
$$\left( V D^\frac{1}{2} V^{-1} \right)^2 = V D^\frac{1}{2} \left( V^{-1} V \right) D^\frac{1}{2} V^{-1} = V D V^{-1} = A.$$

For example, the matrix
$$A = \begin{bmatrix} 33 & 24\\ 48 & 57\end{bmatrix}$$
can be diagonalized as VDV^{−1}, where

$$V = \begin{bmatrix} 1 & 1\\ 2 & -1\end{bmatrix}\$$
and
$$\ D = \begin{bmatrix} 81 & 0\\ 0 & 9\end{bmatrix}$$.

D has principal square root

$$D^\frac{1}{2} = \begin{bmatrix} 9 & 0\\ 0 & 3\end{bmatrix}$$,

giving the square root

$$A^\frac{1}{2} = V D^\frac{1}{2} V^{-1} = \begin{bmatrix} 5 & 2\\ 4 & 7\end{bmatrix}$$.

When A is symmetric, the diagonalizing matrix V can be made an orthogonal matrix by suitably choosing the eigenvectors (see spectral theorem). Then the inverse of V is simply the transpose, so that

$R = V S V^\textsf{T}$.

=== By Schur decomposition ===
Every complex-valued square matrix $A$, regardless of diagonalizability, has a Schur decomposition given by $A = Q U Q^*$ where $U$ is upper triangular and $Q$ is unitary (meaning $Q^* = Q^{-1}$). The eigenvalues of $A$ are exactly the diagonal entries of $U$; if at most one of them is zero, then the following is a square root of $A$:

$A^\frac{1}{2} = Q U^\frac{1}{2} Q^*$,

where a square root $U^\frac{1}{2}$ of the upper triangular matrix $U$ can be found as described above.

If $A$ is positive definite, then its eigenvalues are all positive reals, so one can choose positive reals for all the diagonal entries of $U^\frac{1}{2}$. Hence the eigenvalues of $Q U^\frac{1}{2} Q^*$ are all positive reals, which means the resulting matrix is the principal root of $A$.

=== By Jordan decomposition ===
Similarly as for the Schur decomposition, every square matrix $A$ can be decomposed as $A = P J P^{-1}$ where:

- $P$ is invertible, and
- $J$ is in Jordan normal form, that is, $J$ is a block-diagonal matrix $\mathrm{diag} \big( B_k, \dots, B_1 \big)$ where $B_k, \dots, B_1$ are Jordan blocks (thus, $J$ is also upper triangular).

To see that any real matrix with positive eigenvalues has a real matrix square root with positive eigenvalues, it suffices to check this for a Jordan block. Any such block $B$ has the form $\lambda (I + N)$ where:

- $\lambda$ is real positive, and
- $N$ is nilpotent, that is, $N^\ell = 0$ for some positive integer $\ell$.

Consider the MacLaurin series
$$(1 + z)^\frac{1}{2} = 1 + {\frac12 \choose 1} z + {\frac12 \choose 2} z^2 + \cdots.$$
Substituting $N$ for $z$, one gets a finite sum, since only the $\ell$ first terms may be non-zero. It follows that
$$B^\frac{1}{2} = \sqrt{\lambda (I+N)} = \sqrt{\lambda} \left( I + {\frac12 \choose 1} N + {\frac12 \choose 2} N^2 + \cdots + {\frac12 \choose {\ell-1}} N^{\ell-1} \right).$$
$N$ is upper triangular with all eigenvalues zero, so $B^\frac12$ is upper triangular with all eigenvalues $\sqrt \lambda$, real positive.

Thus, $J^\frac12 = \mathrm{diag} \! \left( \! B_k^\frac12, \dots, B_1^\frac12 \! \right)$ where $B_k^\frac12, \dots, B_1^\frac12$ are upper triangular (but not necessarily Jordan blocks).

Finally, $A^\frac12 = P \, J^\frac12 P^{-1}$.

The validity of the result may be proved by expanding the square of the result. A simpler method consists of replacing $N$ with $tN$, where $t$ is an auxiliary real variable, mimicking the proof of Taylor's theorem for this case, and making $t = 1$ at the end.

=== By power series ===
Recall the formal power series
$$(1 - z)^\frac{1}{2} = \sum_{n=0}^\infty (-1)^n \binom{\frac12}{n} z^n,$$
which converges provided that $|z| \leq 1$ (since the coefficients of the power series are summable). Plugging in $z = I - A$ into this expression yields
$$A^\frac{1}{2} = \sum_{n=0}^\infty (-1)^n {\frac12 \choose n} (I - A)^n,$$
provided that $\limsup_n \|(I - A)^n\|^\frac{1}{n} \leq 1$. By virtue of Gelfand formula, this condition is equivalent to the requirement that the spectrum of $A$ is contained within the closed disk $D(1,1) \subset \C$. This method of defining or computing $A^\frac{1}{2}$ is especially useful in the case where $A$ is positive semi-definite, and symmetric if real. (Note: If the matrix $A$ is real, then it must be symmetric as well, otherwise $\left\| I - \frac{A}{\|A\|_2} \right\|_2$ might exceed $1$. For example, the real matrix $$A = \begin{bmatrix} 5 & -12 \\ 12 & \phantom{-}5 \end{bmatrix}$$ is not symmetric, and: For any non-zero real vector $$v = \begin{bmatrix} x \\ y \end{bmatrix}$$ , $v^\mathsf{T} \! A \, v = x(5x-12y) + y(12x+5y) = 5x^2 + 5y^2 > 0$; so $A$ is positive definite.: $A^\mathsf{T} A = 169 I$ (by direct calculation); $\|A\|_2 = \sigma_1 (A) = \max_j \sqrt{\lambda_j (A^\mathsf{T} A)}$; so $\|A\|_2 = \sqrt{169} = 13$. Now, let $Z = I - \frac{A}{\|A\|_2}$.: $$Z = \begin{bmatrix} \phantom{-}\frac{8}{13} & \frac{12}{13} \\ -\frac{12}{13} & \frac{8}{13} \end{bmatrix}$$ (by direct calculation).; $Z^\mathsf{T} Z = \frac{16}{13} I$ (by direct calculation); $\|Z\|_2 = \sigma_1 (Z) = \max_j \sqrt{\lambda_j (Z^\mathsf{T} Z)}$; so $\|Z\|_2 = \frac{4}{\sqrt{13}} \approx 1.1 > 1$ (even though $A$ is normal, actually).) Then, we have $\left\|I - \frac{A}{\|A\|}\right\| \leq 1$ and therefore $\left\|\left(I - \frac{A}{\|A\|}\right)^n\right\| \leq \left\|I - \frac{A}{\|A\|}\right\|^n \leq 1$, so that
$$A^\frac{1}{2} = \|A\|^\frac{1}{2} \sum_{n=0}^\infty (-1)^n \binom{\frac12}{n} \left(I - \frac{A}{\|A\|}\right)^n$$
defines a square root of $A$ which moreover turns out to be the unique symmetric positive semi-definite one. This method remains valid to define square roots of operators on infinite-dimensional Banach or Hilbert spaces or certain elements of ($C^*$) Banach algebras.

== Iterative solutions ==
=== By Denman–Beavers iteration ===
Another way to find the square root of an $n \times n$ matrix $A$ is the Denman–Beavers square root iteration.

Let $Y_0 = A$ and $Z_0 = I$, where $I$ is the $n \times n$ identity matrix. The iteration is defined by

$$\begin{align}
Y_{k+1} &= \frac{1}{2} \left( Y_k + Z_k^{-1} \right), \\
Z_{k+1} &= \frac{1}{2} \left( Z_k + Y_k^{-1} \right).
\end{align}$$

As this uses a pair of sequences of matrix inverses whose later elements change comparatively little, only the first elements have a high computational cost since the remainder can be computed from earlier elements with only a few passes of a variant of Newton's method for computing inverses,

$X_{n+1} = 2X_n - X_n B X_n$.

With this, for later values of $k$ one would set $X_0 = Z_{k-1}^{-1}$ and $B = Z_k$, and then use $Z_k^{-1} = X_n$ for some small $n$ (perhaps just $1$), and similarly for $Y_k^{-1}$.

Convergence is not guaranteed, even for matrices that do have square roots; but if the process converges, the matrix $Y_k$ converges quadratically to a square root $A^{1/2}$, while $Z_k$ converges to its inverse, $A^{-1/2}$.

=== By the Babylonian method ===
Yet another iterative method is obtained by taking the well-known formula of the Babylonian method for computing the square root of a real number, and applying it to matrices. Let $X_0 = I$, where $I$ is the identity matrix. The iteration is defined by

$X_{k+1} = \frac{1}{2} \left(X_k + A X_k^{-1}\right)$.

Again, convergence is not guaranteed, but if the process converges, the matrix $X_k$ converges quadratically to a square root $A^{1/2}$. Compared to Denman–Beavers iteration, an advantage of the Babylonian method is that only one matrix inverse need be computed per iteration step. On the other hand, as Denman–Beavers iteration uses a pair of sequences of matrix inverses whose later elements change comparatively little, only the first elements have a high computational cost since the remainder can be computed from earlier elements with only a few passes of a variant of Newton's method for computing inverses (see Denman–Beavers iteration above); of course, the same approach can be used to get the single sequence of inverses needed for the Babylonian method. However, unlike Denman–Beavers iteration, the Babylonian method is numerically unstable and more likely to fail to converge.

The Babylonian method follows from Newton's method for the equation $X^2 - A = 0$ and using $A X_k = X_k A$ for all $k$.

== Square roots of positive operators ==
In linear algebra and operator theory, given a bounded positive semidefinite operator (a non-negative operator) T on a complex Hilbert space, B is a square root of T if T = B* B, where B* denotes the Hermitian adjoint of B. According to the spectral theorem, the continuous functional calculus can be applied to obtain an operator T^{1/2} such that T^{1/2} is itself positive semidefinite and (T^{1/2})^{2} = T. The operator T^{1/2} is the unique non-negative square root of T.

A bounded non-negative operator on a complex Hilbert space is self-adjoint by definition. So T = (T^{1/2})* T^{1/2}. Conversely, it is trivially true that every operator of the form B* B is non-negative. Therefore, an operator T is non-negative if and only if T = B* B for some B (equivalently, T = CC* for some C).

The Cholesky factorization provides another particular example of square root, which should not be confused with the unique non-negative square root.

=== Unitary freedom of square roots ===
If T is a non-negative operator on a finite-dimensional Hilbert space, then all square roots of T are related by unitary transformations. More precisely, if T = A* A = B* B, then there exists a unitary operator U such that A = UB.

Indeed, take B = T^{1/2} to be the unique non-negative square root of T. If T is strictly positive, then B is invertible, and so U = AB^{−1} is unitary:

$$\begin{align}
U^*U &= \left(\left(B^*\right)^{-1}A^*\right)\left(AB^{-1}\right)
= \left(B^*\right)^{-1}T \left(B^{-1}\right) \\
&= \left(B^*\right)^{-1} B^* B \left(B^{-1}\right) = I.
\end{align}$$

If T is non-negative without being strictly positive, then the inverse of B cannot be defined, but the Moore–Penrose pseudoinverse B^{+} can be. In that case, the operator B^{+} A is a partial isometry, that is, a unitary operator from the range of T to itself. This can then be extended to a unitary operator U on the whole space by setting it equal to the identity on the kernel of T. More generally, this is true on an infinite-dimensional Hilbert space if, in addition, T has closed range. In general, if A, B are closed and densely defined operators on a Hilbert space H, and A* A = B* B, then A = UB where U is a partial isometry.

=== Some applications ===
Square roots, and the unitary freedom of square roots, have applications throughout functional analysis and linear algebra.

==== Polar decomposition ====
If A is an invertible operator on a finite-dimensional Hilbert space, then there is a unique unitary operator U and positive operator P such that

$$A = UP;$$

this is the polar decomposition of A. The positive operator P is the unique positive square root of the positive operator A^{∗} A, and U is defined by U = AP^{−1}.

If A is not invertible, then it still has a polar decomposition in which P is defined in the same way (and is unique). The unitary operator U is not unique. Rather it is possible to determine a "natural" unitary operator as follows: AP^{+} is a unitary operator from the range of A to itself, which can be extended by the identity on the kernel of A^{∗}. The resulting unitary operator U then yields the polar decomposition of A.

==== Kraus operators ====
By Choi's result, a linear map

$$\Phi : \C^{n \times n} \to \C^{m \times m}$$

is completely positive if and only if it is of the form

$$\Phi(A) = \sum_i^k V_i A V_i^*$$

where k ≤ nm. Let {E_{p,q}} ⊂ C^{n × n} be the n^{2} elementary matrix units. The positive matrix

$$M_\Phi = \left( \Phi \left( E_{p,q} \right) \right)_{p,q} \in \C^{nm \times nm}$$

is called the Choi matrix of Φ. The Kraus operators correspond to the, not necessarily square, square roots of M_{Φ}: For any square root B of M_{Φ}, one can obtain a family of Kraus operators V_{i} by undoing the Vec operation to each column b_{i} of B. Thus all sets of Kraus operators are related by partial isometries.

==== Mixed ensembles ====
In quantum physics, a density matrix for an n-level quantum system is an n × n complex matrix ρ that is positive semidefinite with trace 1. If ρ can be expressed as

$$\rho = \sum_i p_i v_i v_i^*$$

where $p_i > 0$ and Σ p_{i} = 1, the set

$$\left\{ p_i,  v_i \right\}$$

is said to be an ensemble that describes the mixed state ρ. Notice the family {v_{i}} is not required to be orthogonal. Different ensembles describing the state ρ are related by unitary operators, via the square roots of ρ. For instance, suppose

$$\rho = \sum_j a_j a_j^*.$$

The trace 1 condition means

$$\sum_j a_j^* a_j = 1.$$

Let

$$p_i = a_i^* a_i,$$

and v_{i} be the normalized a_{i}. We see that

$$\left\{ p_i,  v_i \right\}$$

gives the mixed state ρ.

== See also ==
- Matrix function
- Holomorphic functional calculus
- Logarithm of a matrix
- Sylvester's formula
- Square root of a 2 by 2 matrix
