= Robert Schatten =

American mathematician (1911–1977)

- Born: Rubin Schatten; January 28, 1911; Lwów, Poland
- Died: August 26, 1977 (aged 66); New York City
- Education: Jan Kazimierz University of Lwów; Columbia University
- Known for: Schatten norm Schatten class operator
- Scientific career
- Fields: Mathematics
- Workplaces: University of Vermont; University of Kansas; City University of New York
- Thesis: On the Direct Product of Banach Spaces (1943)
- Doctoral advisor: Francis Joseph Murray
- Doctoral students: Elliott Ward Cheney, Jr.

Rubin "Robert" Schatten (January 28, 1911 – August 26, 1977) was a Polish-American mathematician.

== Education and career ==
Schatten was born to a Jewish family in Lviv (then Lemberg) during the Austro-Hungarian Empire. His intellectual origins were at Lwów School of Mathematics, particularly well known for fundamental contributions to functional analysis. His entire family was murdered during World War II, he himself emigrated to the United States.

In 1933 he got magister degree at Jan Kazimierz University of Lwów. He left Europe after losing his family in the Holocaust. In 1939, Schatten got master's degree at Columbia University. Supervised by Francis Joseph Murray, he got doctorate degree in 1942 for the thesis "On the Direct Product of Banach Spaces". Shortly after being appointed to a junior professorship, he joined the United States army where during training he suffered a back injury which affected him for the remainder of his life. In 1943 he was appointed to an assistant professorship at University of Vermont. At National Research Council, by two years he worked with John von Neumann and Nelson Dunford. In 1946, he went to the University of Kansas, first as extraordinary professor until 1952 and then as ordinary professor until 1961. He stayed at Institute for Advanced Study in 1950 and 1952–1953, at University of Southern California in 1960–1961, and at State University of New York in 1961–1962. In 1962 he became professor at Hunter College, where he stayed until his death.

Schatten widely studied tensor products of Banach spaces. In functional analysis, he is the namesake of the Schatten norm and the Schatten class operators. His doctoral students included Elliott Ward Cheney, Jr. at University of Kansas, and Peter Falley and Charles Masiello at City University of New York.

== Books ==
- Schatten, Robert (1950). A Theory of Cross-Spaces. Annals of Mathematics Studies. Princeton University Press. ISBN 978-0-691-08396-4.
- Schatten, Robert (1960). Norm Ideals of Completely Continuous Operators. Ergebnisse der Mathematik und Ihrer Grenzgebiete. 2. Folge Ser. Berlin, Heidelberg: Springer Berlin / Heidelberg. ISBN 978-3-642-87652-3.
