= Francis Joseph Murray =

American mathematician

- Born: February 3, 1911; New York City
- Died: March 15, 1996 (aged 85); Durham, North Carolina
- Education: Columbia University
- Scientific career
- Fields: Mathematics
- Workplaces: Columbia University; Duke University
- Doctoral advisor: Bernard Koopman
- Doctoral students: Robert Schatten; Ernst G. Straus

Francis Joseph Murray (February 3, 1911 – March 15, 1996) was a mathematician, known for his foundational work (with John von Neumann) on functional analysis, and what subsequently became known as von Neumann algebras. He received his BA from Columbia College in 1932 and PhD from Columbia University in 1936. He taught at Duke University.

In 1967 he was awarded the Outstanding Civilian Service Medal by the U. S. Army.

== Selected publications ==
- 1936 (with J. von Neumann), "On rings of operators," Ann. of Math. 2(37): 116–229. The original paper on von Neumann algebras.
- 1937 (with J. von Neumann), "On rings of operators II," Trans. Amer. Math. Soc. 41: 208–248.
- 1943 (with J. von Neumann), "On rings of operators IV," Ann. of Math. 2(44): 716–808.
- 1941. An Introduction to Linear Transformations in Hilbert Space. Annals of Mathematics Studies, no. 4. Princeton Univ. Press.
- 1947. The theory of mathematical machines. Columbia Univ. Press.
- 1954. (with Kenneth S. Miller). Existence Theorems for Ordinary Differential Equations. ISBN 0-88275-320-7; 2nd printing Krieger 1976; reprint Dover 2013.
- 1978. Applied Mathematics: An Intellectual Orientation. ISBN 0-306-39252-6
