= ATPase =

Class of enzymes

Adenosinetriphosphatase

Identifiers
- EC no.: 3.6.1.3
- CAS no.: 9000-83-3

Databases
- BRENDA: enzyme data
- ExPASy: NiceZyme view
- KEGG: enzyme entry
- MetaCyc: metabolic pathway
- Rhea: reactions
- PDB structures: RCSB PDB PDBe PDBsum
Search
- PMC: articles
- PubMed: articles
- NCBI: proteins

Adenosine triphosphate

Adenosine diphosphate

Adenosine monophosphate

ATPases (EC 3.6.1.3, Adenosine 5'-TriPhosphatase, adenylpyrophosphatase, ATP monophosphatase, triphosphatase, ATP hydrolase, adenosine triphosphatase) are a class of enzymes that catalyze the decomposition of ATP into ADP and a free phosphate ion or the inverse reaction. This dephosphorylation reaction releases energy, which the enzyme (in most cases) harnesses to drive other chemical reactions that would not otherwise occur. This process is widely used in all known forms of life.

Some such enzymes are integral membrane proteins (anchored within biological membranes), and move solutes across the membrane, typically against their concentration gradient. These are called transmembrane ATPases.

== Functions ==
Na^{+}/K^{+}ATPase

Transmembrane ATPases import metabolites necessary for cell metabolism and export toxins, wastes, and solutes that can hinder cellular processes. An important example is the sodium-potassium pump (Na^{+}/K^{+}ATPase) that maintains the cell membrane potential. Another example is the hydrogen potassium ATPase (H^{+}/K^{+}ATPase or gastric proton pump) that acidifies the contents of the stomach. ATPase is genetically conserved in animals; therefore, cardenolides which are toxic steroids produced by plants that act on ATPases, make general and effective animal toxins that act dose dependently.

Besides exchangers, other categories of transmembrane ATPase include co-transporters and pumps (however, some exchangers are also pumps). Some of these, like the Na^{+}/K^{+}ATPase, cause a net flow of charge, but others do not. These are called electrogenic transporters and electroneutral transporters, respectively. Genetic variants in ATPases result in a wide spectrum of human diseases, from prenatal to later onset disease.

== Structure ==
The Walker motifs are a telltale protein sequence motif for nucleotide binding and hydrolysis. Beyond this broad function, the Walker motifs can be found in almost all natural ATPases, with the notable exception of tyrosine kinases. The Walker motifs commonly form a Beta sheet-turn-Alpha helix that is self-organized as a Nest (protein structural motif). This is thought to be because modern ATPases evolved from small NTP-binding peptides that had to be self-organized.

Protein design has been able to replicate the ATPase function (weakly) without using natural ATPase sequences or structures. Importantly, while all natural ATPases have some beta-sheet structure, the designed "Alternative ATPase" lacks beta sheet structure, demonstrating that this life-essential function is possible with sequences and structures not found in nature.

== Mechanism ==
ATPase (also called F_{o}F_{1}-ATP Synthase) is a charge-transferring complex that catalyzes ATP to perform ATP synthesis by moving ions through the membrane.

The coupling of ATP hydrolysis and transport is a chemical reaction in which a fixed number of solute molecules are transported for each ATP molecule hydrolyzed; for the Na^{+}/K^{+} exchanger, this is three Na^{+} ions out of the cell and two K+ ions inside per ATP molecule hydrolyzed.

Transmembrane ATPases make use of ATP's chemical potential energy by performing mechanical work: they transport solutes in the opposite direction of their thermodynamically preferred direction of movement—that is, from the side of the membrane with low concentration to the side with high concentration. This process is referred to as active transport.

For instance, inhibiting vesicular H^{+}-ATPases would result in a rise in the pH within vesicles and a drop in the pH of the cytoplasm.

All of the ATPases share a common basic structure. Each rotary ATPase is composed of two major components: F_{o}/A_{0}/V_{0} and F_{1}/A_{1}/V_{1}. They are connected by 1-3 stalks to maintain stability, control rotation, and prevent them from rotating in the other direction. One stalk is utilized to transmit torque. The number of peripheral stalks is dependent on the type of ATPase: F-ATPases have one, A-ATPases have two, and V-ATPases have three. The F_{1} catalytic domain is located on the N-side (negative-side) of the membrane and is involved in the synthesis and degradation of ATP and is involved in oxidative phosphorylation. The F_{o} transmembrane domain is involved in the movement of ions across the membrane.

The bacterial F_{o}F_{1}-ATPase consists of the soluble F_{1} domain and the transmembrane F_{o} domain, which is composed of several subunits with varying stoichiometry. There are two subunits, γ, and ε, that form the central stalk and they are linked to F_{o}. F_{o} contains a c-subunit oligomer in the shape of a ring (c-ring). The α subunit is close to the subunit b_{2} and makes up the stalk that connects the transmembrane subunits to the α3β3 and δ subunits. F-ATP synthases are identical in appearance and function except for the mitochondrial F_{o}F_{1}-ATP synthase, which contains 7-9 additional subunits.

The electrochemical potential is what causes the c-ring to rotate in a clockwise direction for ATP synthesis. This causes the central stalk and the catalytic domain to change shape. Rotating the c-ring causes three ATP molecules to be made, which then causes H^{+} to move from the P-side (positive-side) of the membrane to the N-side (negative-side) of the membrane. The counterclockwise rotation of the c-ring is driven by ATP hydrolysis and ions move from the N-side to the P-side, which helps to build up electrochemical potential.

== Transmembrane ATP synthases ==
The ATP synthase of mitochondria and chloroplasts is an anabolic enzyme that harnesses the energy of a transmembrane proton gradient as an energy source for adding an inorganic phosphate group to a molecule of adenosine diphosphate (ADP) to form a molecule of adenosine triphosphate (ATP).

This enzyme works when a proton moves down the concentration gradient, giving the enzyme a spinning motion. This unique spinning motion bonds ADP and P together to create ATP.

ATP synthase can also function in reverse, that is, use energy released by ATP hydrolysis to pump protons against their electrochemical gradient.

== Classification ==
There are different types of ATPases, which can differ in function (ATP synthesis and/or hydrolysis), structure (F-, V- and A-ATPases contain rotary motors) and in the type of ions they transport.

- Rotary ATPases
  - F-ATPases (F1FO-ATPases) in mitochondria, chloroplasts and bacterial plasma membranes are the prime producers of ATP, using the proton gradient generated by oxidative phosphorylation (mitochondria) or photosynthesis (chloroplasts).
    - F-ATPases lacking a delta/OSCP subunit move sodium ions instead. They are proposed to be called N-ATPases, since they seem to form a distinct group that is further apart from usual F-ATPases than A-ATPases are from V-ATPases.
  - V-ATPases (V1VO-ATPases) are primarily found in eukaryotic vacuoles, catalysing ATP hydrolysis to transport solutes and lower pH in organelles like proton pump of lysosome.
  - A-ATPases (A1AO-ATPases) are found in Archaea and some extremophilic bacteria. They are arranged like V-ATPases, but function like F-ATPases mainly as ATP synthases.
  - Many homologs that are not necessarily rotary exist. See ATP synthase § Evolution.
- P-ATPases (E1E2-ATPases) are found in bacteria, fungi and in eukaryotic plasma membranes and organelles, and function to transport a variety of different ions across membranes.
- E-ATPases are cell-surface enzymes that hydrolyze a range of NTPs, including extracellular ATP. Examples include ecto-ATPases, CD39s, and ecto-ATP/Dases, all of which are members of a "GDA1 CD39" superfamily.
- AAA proteins are a family of ring-shaped P-loop NTPases.

=== P-ATPase ===
P-ATPases (sometime known as E1-E2 ATPases) are found in bacteria and also in eukaryotic plasma membranes and organelles. Its name is due to short time attachment of inorganic phosphate at the aspartate residues at the time of activation. Function of P-ATPase is to transport a variety of different compounds, like ions and phospholipids, across a membrane using ATP hydrolysis for energy. There are many different classes of P-ATPases, which transports a specific type of ion. P-ATPases may be composed of one or two polypeptides, and can usually take two main conformations, E1 and E2.

=== Human genes ===
- Na^{+}/K^{+} transporting: ATP1A1, ATP1A2, ATP1A3, ATP1A4, ATP1B1, ATP1B2, ATP1B3, ATP1B4
- Ca^{2+} transporting: ATP2A1, ATP2A2, ATP2A3, ATP2B1, ATP2B2, ATP2B3, ATP2B4, ATP2C1, ATP2C2
- H^{+}/K^{+} exchanging: ATP4A
- H^{+} transporting, mitochondrial: ATP5F1A, ATP5F1B, ATP5F1C, ATP5C2, ATP5F1D, ATP5F1E, ATP5F1, ATP5MC1, ATP5MC2, ATP5MC3, ATP5PD, ATP5ME, ATP5PF, ATP5MF, ATP5MG, ATP5L2, ATP5PO, ATP5S, MT-ATP6, MT-ATP8
- H^{+} transporting, lysosomal: ATP6AP1, ATP6AP2, ATP6V1A, ATP6V1B1, ATP6V1B2, ATP6V1C1, ATP6V1C2, ATP6V1D, ATP6V1E1, ATP6V1E2, ATP6V1F, ATP6V1G1, ATP6V1G2, ATP6V1G3, ATP6V1H, ATP6V0A1, ATP6V0A2, ATP6V0A4, ATP6V0B, ATP6V0C, ATP6V0D1, ATP6V0D2, ATP6V0E
- Cu^{2+} transporting: ATP7A, ATP7B
- Class I, type 8: ATP8A1, ATP8B1, ATP8B2, ATP8B3, ATP8B4
- Class II, type 9: ATP9A, ATP9B
- Class V, type 10: ATP10A, ATP10B, ATP10D
- Class VI, type 11: ATP11A, ATP11B, ATP11C
- H^{+}/K^{+} transporting, nongastric: ATP12A
- type 13: ATP13A1, ATP13A2, ATP13A3, ATP13A4, ATP13A5

== See also ==
- ATP synthase
- ATP synthase alpha/beta subunits
- AAA proteins
- P-ATPase
