= V0 =

V0 may refer to:

- The IATA airline designator for Conviasa
- V0-morph, an organism that changes in shape during growth such that its surface area is constant, i.e. proportional to its volume (hence "V") to the power zero (hence "0")
- ATPase, H+ transporting, lysosomal V0 subunit a1, a human gene
- The highest standard quality setting for variable-bitrate (VBR) MP3 files
- A classification under the UL 94 plastics flammability standard
- Initial velocity
- Socket V0, codename of Intel's LGA 1700
- v0 by Vercel, a tool to generate user interface using natural language prompts

== See also ==
- 0V (disambiguation)
