= NAV1 =

Protein-coding gene in humans

Identifiers
- Aliases: NAV1, POMFIL3, STEERIN1, UNC53H1, neuron navigator 1
- External IDs: OMIM: 611628; MGI: 2183683; GeneCards: NAV1

Gene location (Human)
Chr.	Chromosome 1 (human)
Band	1q32.1	Start	201,622,885 bp
Band	1q32.1	End	201,826,969 bp

Gene location (Mouse)
Chr.	Chromosome 1 (mouse)
Band	1|1 E4	Start	135,362,318 bp
Band	1|1 E4	End	135,615,843 bp
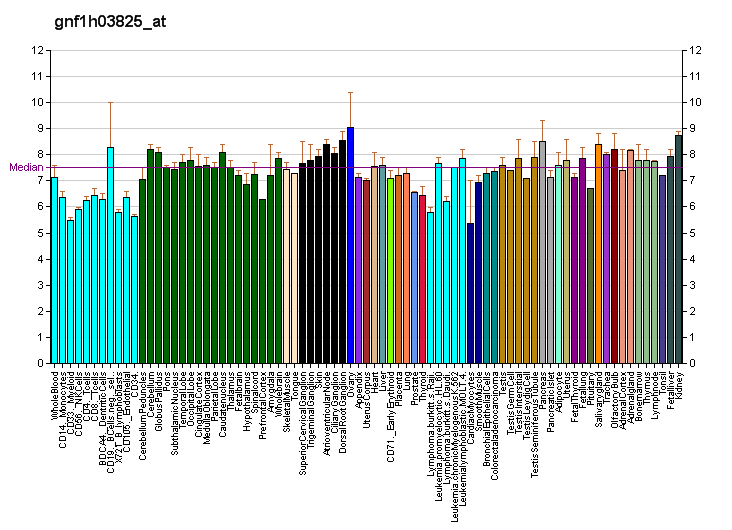
RNA expression pattern
Bgee	Human / Mouse (ortholog); Top expressed in: endothelial cell; external globus pallidus; myocardium of left ventricle; lateral nuclear group of thalamus; saphenous vein; pars reticulata; Brodmann area 23; middle temporal gyrus; inferior ganglion of vagus nerve; pericardium / Top expressed in: Rostral migratory stream; tail of embryo; internal carotid artery; genital tubercle; external carotid artery; ventromedial nucleus; vas deferens; subiculum; ganglionic eminence; anterior amygdaloid area; More reference expression data
BioGPS	More reference expression data
Gene ontology
Molecular function	protein binding
Cellular component	cytoplasm; microtubule cytoskeleton; microtubule; cytoskeleton; axon initial segment
Biological process	multicellular organism development; cell differentiation; neuron migration; microtubule bundle formation; nervous system development; neurogenesis
Sources:Amigo / QuickGO
Orthologs
Databases	NCBI: entry; OMA: entry
Species	Human	Mouse
Entrez	89796	215690
Ensembl	ENSG00000134369	ENSMUSG00000009418
UniProt	Q8NEY1	Q8CH77
RefSeq (mRNA)	NM_001167738; NM_020443	NM_173437
RefSeq (protein)	NP_001161210; NP_065176	NP_775613
Location (UCSC)	Chr 1: 201.62 – 201.83 Mb	Chr 1: 135.36 – 135.62 Mb
PubMed search
- Wikidata
View/Edit Human	View/Edit Mouse

Neuron navigator 1 is a protein that in humans is encoded by the NAV1 gene.

This gene belongs to the neuron navigator family and is expressed predominantly in the nervous system. The encoded protein contains coiled-coil domains and a conserved AAA domain characteristic for ATPases associated with a variety of cellular activities. This gene is similar to unc-53, a Caenorhabditis elegans gene involved in axon guidance. The exact function of this gene is not known.
