= Transmembrane protein 268 =

Protein-coding gene in the species Homo sapiens

TMEM268

Identifiers
- Aliases: TMEM268, C9orf91, transmembrane protein 268
- External IDs: MGI: 1913920; HomoloGene: 17005; GeneCards: TMEM268; OMA:TMEM268 - orthologs

Gene location (Human)
Chr.	Chromosome 9 (human)
Band	9q32	Start	114,611,206 bp
Band	9q32	End	114,646,422 bp

Gene location (Mouse)
Chr.	Chromosome 4 (mouse)
Band	4|4 B3	Start	63,477,018 bp
Band	4|4 B3	End	63,504,594 bp
RNA expression pattern
Bgee	Human / Mouse (ortholog); Top expressed in: endothelial cell; middle temporal gyrus; prefrontal cortex; retinal pigment epithelium; primary visual cortex; Brodmann area 23; right frontal lobe; dorsolateral prefrontal cortex; monocyte; Brodmann area 9 / Top expressed in: substantia nigra; granulocyte; iris; olfactory epithelium; motor neuron; Ileal epithelium; lumbar subsegment of spinal cord; muscle of thigh; stroma of bone marrow; Paneth cell; More reference expression data
BioGPS	n/a
Gene ontology
Molecular function	molecular function
Cellular component	membrane; integral component of membrane; cellular component
Biological process	biological process
Sources:Amigo / QuickGO
Orthologs
Species	Human	Mouse
Entrez	203197	230279
Ensembl	ENSG00000157693	ENSMUSG00000045917
UniProt	Q5VZI3	Q8R239
RefSeq (mRNA)	NM_153045; NM_001330760	NM_144905; NM_001356354; NM_001356355
RefSeq (protein)	NP_001317689; NP_694590	NP_659154; NP_001343283; NP_001343284
Location (UCSC)	Chr 9: 114.61 – 114.65 Mb	Chr 4: 63.48 – 63.5 Mb
PubMed search
- Wikidata
View/Edit Human	View/Edit Mouse

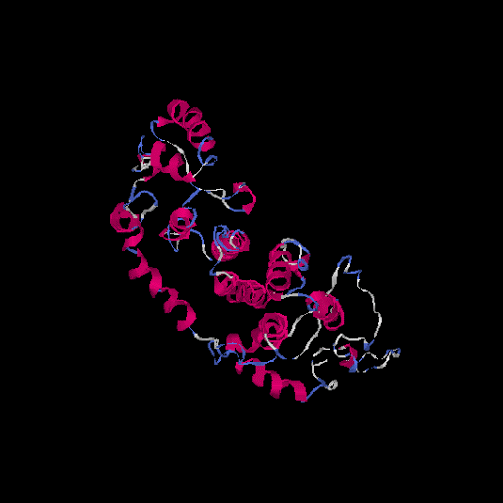
. C9orf91 I-Tasser Predicted Protein Structure with a score of -2.87

Transmembrane protein 268 is a protein that in humans is encoded by TMEM268 gene. The protein is a transmembrane protein of 342 amino acids long with eight alternative splice variants. The protein has been identified in organisms from the common fruit fly to primates. To date, there has been no protein expression found in organisms simpler than insects.

C9orf91

Identifiers
- Symbol: C9orf91
- NCBI gene: 203197
- HGNC: 24513
- RefSeq: NP_694590.2
- UniProt: Q5VZI3

Other data
- Locus: Chr. 9 q32
Search for
- Structures: Swiss-model
- Domains: InterPro

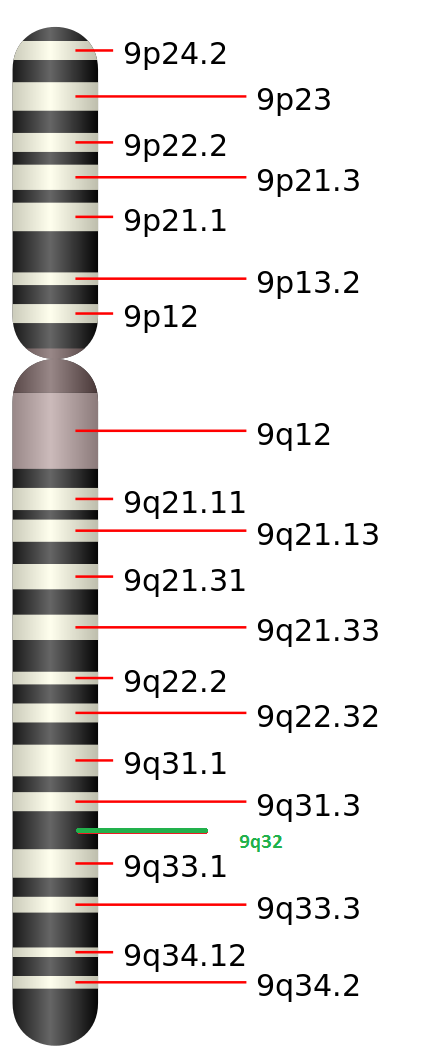
Chromosome 9 is shown. Area in green is 9q32, where C9ORF91 is found.

== Gene ==
=== Location ===
TMEM268 maps on chromosome 9 at 9q32. The gene neighborhood for TMEM268 is shown below. The area enclosed by the red circle is TMEM268's coding region, which is surrounded by neighbors DFNB31 and ATP6V1G1.

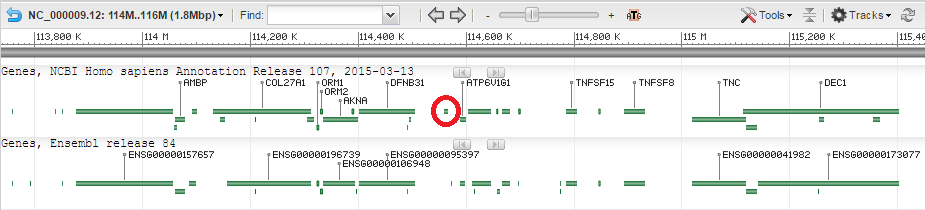
C9ORF91 gene neighborhood within chromosome 9.

== mRNA ==
Eight different alternative splice variants for TMEM268 have been found. The exon Sequence for the combinations shown indicate combined regions. Amino acid length differs due to variants in nucleotide additions or deletions within exon regions, conferring different splice variants with similar sequence combinations.

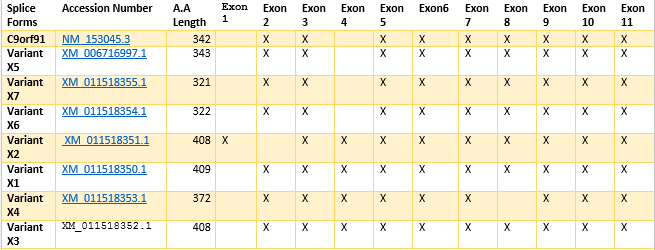
Table for Exon and Transcript Variants for TMEM268

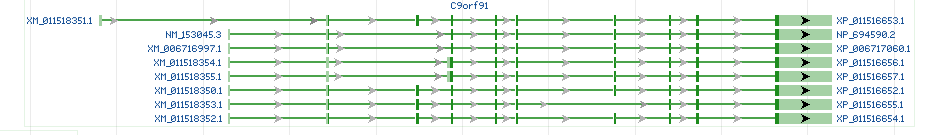
Splice variants of TMEM268 gene.

== Protein ==
=== General Characteristics ===
TMEM268 has seven variants. NP_694590.2 is the variant that is the most studied. An ExPasy result indicates TMEM268 has an isoelectric point at 5.19 and a molecular weight around 37.6 kdal. TMEM268 is a member of a domain of unknown function, DUF4481. The region is located within 37 and 328 in the amino acid sequence. BLAST results indicate there are no paralogs within humans, zebra fish, and fruit flies.

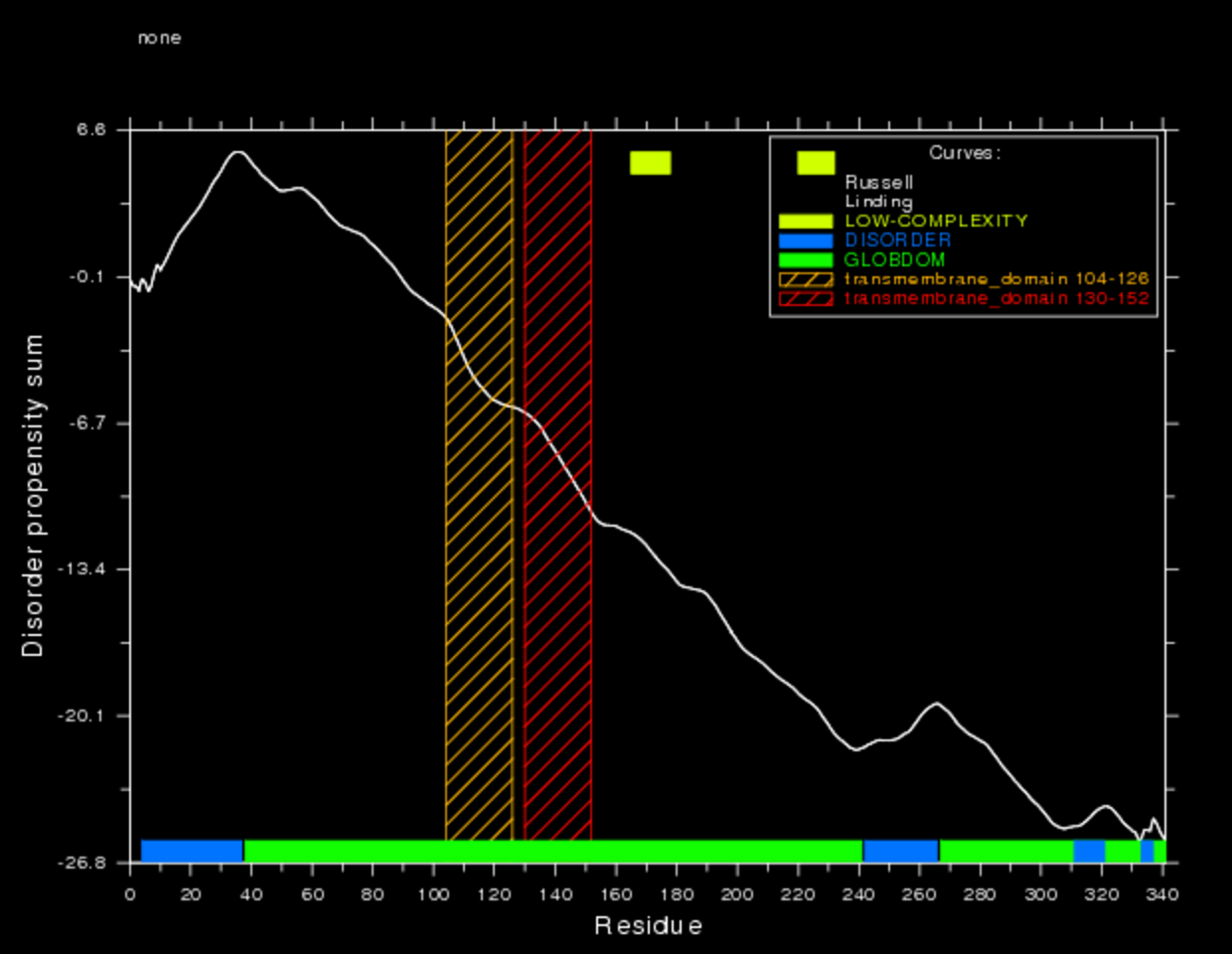
C9orf91 Domain and Transmembrane Globe Plot 2.

=== Transmembrane Characteristics ===
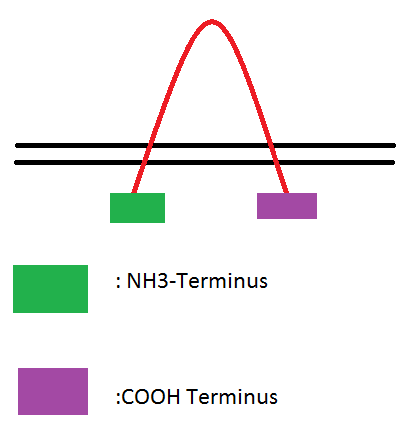
Transmembrane conformation hypothesis of TMEM268.

Two predicted transmembrane regions are on the polypeptide, located at amino acids 104-125 and 130-152 respectively. The SAPS tool on the San Diego Super Computing Biology Workbench garnered protein structural characteristics.

An hypothesis for transmembrane direction is the N terminus and C terminus to remain within the cell, and the loop to stick out of the membrane into the cytosol, presented in the adjacent image.

Evidence for the transmembrane direction stems from phosphorylation site predictions. Net Phos 2.0 results for TMEM268 indicate regions of phosphorylation that are present in areas around the transmembrane region. This indicates the N terminus and C terminus are going to be facing into the cell, providing support to the transmembrane direction.

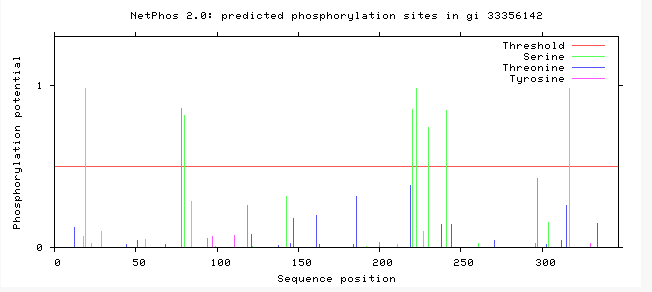
Phosphorylation sites predicted on C9orf91.

== Protein Expression ==
The protein was found to be expressed in numerous different tissues. The ETS Profile for TMEM268 indicates the gene is expressed ubiquitously within the body. In support, there has been experimental evidence using antibody staining to show various tissue types that express TMEM268.

A recent study linked TMEM268 as a lysosome transporter. The exact function within the lysosome and interactions with other molecules, however, is not known.

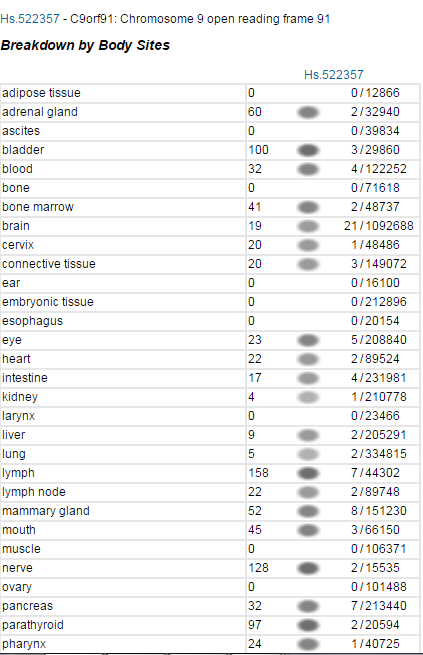
ETS Profile for C9orf91.

== Associated Disease ==
Due to limited characterization, linkage to associated diseases is not well known. Techniques to view SNPs have been used in numerous diseases to determine loci influence. In spondylocostal dysostosis and spondyloarthritis, both were found to have SNPs that had indicated TMEM268 as a possible factor to the diseases

== Interacting Proteins ==
Interacting proteins were found with c-REL(via affinity chromatography and yeast-two hybrid) and ELAV1, via a yeast-two hybrid. REL is associated to be a proto-oncogene that is from a family of transcription factors. It is associated with B-cell proliferation. ELAV1 is associated with binding to mRNA in order to help increase stability of transcripts.

== Homology ==
=== Ortholog identity and similarity ===
Identity of orthologous domains within TMEM268 in other species with a 40% identity and above is shown below. The DUFF4481 start shown on the image retains conservation throughout time. Of interest, areas of transmembrane region are not as conserved as thought, indicating that specific amino acids may not be a vital component towards the protein's function.

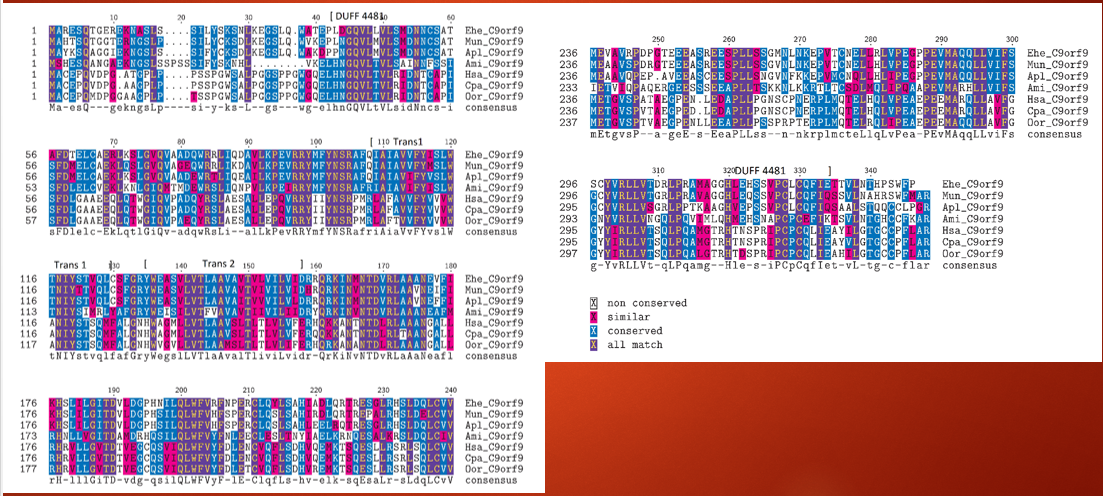
Alignment of sample of orthologs based on 40% or more identity

=== Conservation within species ===
TMEM268 is conserved in many organisms. Orthologs have been found in mammals, birds, reptiles, amphibians, sharks, fish, and a few insects. It was not found within plants, bacteria, or archea. Amino acid length tends to increase within orthologs as divergence from humans goes up based on BLAST search results for similar proteins.
