= 0V =

0V ("zero/oh V") or 0-V may refer to:

- 0v, or zero volts, a complete lack of voltage
  - Zero-voltage switching; see Switched-mode power supply
- 0 vector, or null vector, a vector where all components are zero
  - 0 vector space; see Examples of vector spaces
- 0-velocity surface, or Zero-velocity surface

== See also ==
- V0 (disambiguation)
- OV (disambiguation)
