= ATP6V1G3 =

Protein-coding gene in humans

Identifiers
- Aliases: ATP6V1G3, ATP6G3, Vma10, ATPase H+ transporting V1 subunit G3
- External IDs: OMIM: 618071; MGI: 2450548; GeneCards: ATP6V1G3

Gene location (Human)
Chr.	Chromosome 1 (human)
Band	1q31.3	Start	198,523,222 bp
Band	1q31.3	End	198,540,945 bp

Gene location (Mouse)
Chr.	Chromosome 1 (mouse)
Band	1|1 E4	Start	138,201,476 bp
Band	1|1 E4	End	138,217,200 bp
RNA expression pattern
Bgee	Human / Mouse (ortholog); Top expressed in: testicle; human kidney; olfactory zone of nasal mucosa; muscle of thigh; minor salivary glands; epithelium of colon; mucosa of transverse colon; lymph node; ganglionic eminence; tonsil / Top expressed in: right kidney; human kidney; renal cortex; skin; zone of skin; limb; muscle of thigh; More reference expression data
BioGPS	n/a
Gene ontology
Molecular function	ATPase binding; P-type proton-exporting transporter activity; ATPase-coupled transmembrane transporter activity
Cellular component	cytosol; plasma membrane; vacuolar proton-transporting V-type ATPase complex
Biological process	proton transmembrane transport; insulin receptor signaling pathway; ion transmembrane transport; ion transport; transferrin transport; phagosome acidification
Sources:Amigo / QuickGO
Orthologs
Databases	NCBI: entry; OMA: entry
Species	Human	Mouse
Entrez	127124	338375
Ensembl	ENSG00000151418; ENSG00000263014	ENSMUSG00000026394
UniProt	Q96LB4	Q8BMC1
RefSeq (mRNA)	NM_133262; NM_133326; NM_001320218; NM_001376861; NM_001376862 NM_001376863	NM_177397
RefSeq (protein)	NP_001307147; NP_573569; NP_579872; NP_001363790; NP_001363791 NP_001363792	NP_796371
Location (UCSC)	Chr 1: 198.52 – 198.54 Mb	Chr 1: 138.2 – 138.22 Mb
PubMed search
- Wikidata
View/Edit Human	View/Edit Mouse

V-type proton ATPase subunit G 3 is an enzyme that in humans is encoded by the ATP6V1G3 gene.

== Function ==
This gene encodes a component of vacuolar ATPase (V-ATPase), a multisubunit enzyme that mediates acidification of eukaryotic intracellular organelles. V-ATPase dependent organelle acidification is necessary for such intracellular processes as protein sorting, zymogen activation, receptor-mediated endocytosis, and synaptic vesicle proton gradient generation. V-ATPase is composed of a cytosolic V1 domain and a transmembrane V0 domain. The V1 domain consists of three A and three B subunits, two G subunits plus the C, D, E, F, and H subunits. The V1 domain contains the ATP catalytic site. The V0 domain consists of five different subunits: a, c, c', c'' and d. Additional isoforms of many of the V1 and V0 subunit proteins are encoded by multiple genes or alternatively spliced transcript variants. This gene encodes one of three G subunit proteins. Transcript variants encoding different isoforms have been found for this gene.
