= ATP6V0C =

Protein-coding gene in the species Homo sapiens

Identifiers
- Aliases: ATP6V0C, ATP6C, ATP6L, ATPL, VATL, VPPC, Vma3, ATPase H+ transporting V0 subunit c
- External IDs: OMIM: 108745; MGI: 88116; GeneCards: ATP6V0C

Gene location (Human)
Chr.	Chromosome 16 (human)
Band	16p13.3	Start	2,513,952 bp
Band	16p13.3	End	2,520,218 bp

Gene location (Mouse)
Chr.	Chromosome 17 (mouse)
Band	17|17 A3.3	Start	24,163,866 bp
Band	17|17 A3.3	End	24,169,702 bp
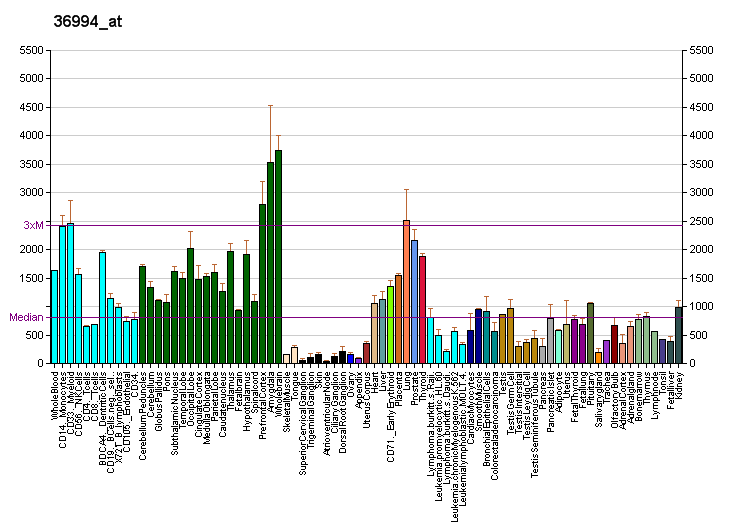

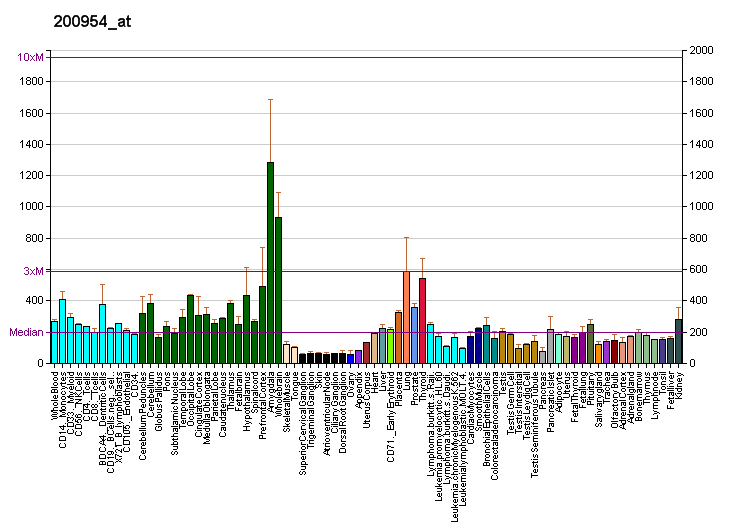
RNA expression pattern
Bgee	Human / Mouse (ortholog); Top expressed in: superior frontal gyrus; right frontal lobe; right hemisphere of cerebellum; primary visual cortex; prefrontal cortex; Brodmann area 9; anterior cingulate cortex; anterior pituitary; hypothalamus; nucleus accumbens / Top expressed in: hippocampus proper; primary visual cortex; dentate gyrus of hippocampal formation granule cell; superior frontal gyrus; olfactory bulb; hypothalamus; cerebellar cortex; basal forebrain; striatum of neuraxis; right kidney; More reference expression data
BioGPS	More reference expression data
Gene ontology
Molecular function	proton-transporting ATP synthase activity, rotational mechanism; proton-transporting ATPase activity, rotational mechanism; protein binding; proton transmembrane transporter activity; ubiquitin protein ligase binding
Cellular component	proton-transporting V-type ATPase, V0 domain; phagocytic vesicle membrane; proton-transporting two-sector ATPase complex, proton-transporting domain; membrane; vacuolar membrane; focal adhesion; vacuolar proton-transporting V-type ATPase, V0 domain; lysosomal membrane; vacuole; endosome membrane; extracellular exosome; plasma membrane; azurophil granule membrane; tertiary granule membrane; ficolin-1-rich granule membrane; integral component of membrane
Biological process	insulin receptor signaling pathway; lysosomal lumen acidification; transferrin transport; ion transport; positive regulation of Wnt signaling pathway; ion transmembrane transport; viral process; regulation of macroautophagy; phagosome acidification; neutrophil degranulation; transport; proton transmembrane transport
Sources:Amigo / QuickGO
Orthologs
Databases	NCBI: entry; OMA: entry
Species	Human	Mouse
Entrez	527	11984
Ensembl	ENSG00000185883	ENSMUSG00000024121
UniProt	P27449	P63082
RefSeq (mRNA)	NM_001694; NM_001198569	NM_009729
RefSeq (protein)	NP_001185498; NP_001685	NP_033859; NP_001348460; NP_001348461; NP_001348462; NP_001348463 NP_001348464
Location (UCSC)	Chr 16: 2.51 – 2.52 Mb	Chr 17: 24.16 – 24.17 Mb
PubMed search
- Wikidata
View/Edit Human	View/Edit Mouse

V-type proton ATPase 16 kDa proteolipid subunit is an enzyme that in humans is encoded by the ATP6V0C gene.

== Function ==
This gene encodes a component of vacuolar ATPase (V-ATPase), a multisubunit enzyme that mediates acidification of eukaryotic intracellular organelles. V-ATPase dependent organelle acidification is necessary for such intracellular processes as protein sorting, zymogen activation, receptor-mediated endocytosis, and synaptic vesicle proton gradient generation. V-ATPase is composed of a cytosolic V1 domain and a transmembrane V0 domain. The V1 domain consists of three A and three B subunits, two G subunits plus the C, D, E, F, and H subunits. The V1 domain contains the ATP catalytic site. The V0 domain consists of five different subunits: a, c, c', c", and d. Additional isoforms of many of the V1 and V0 subunit proteins are encoded by multiple genes or alternatively spliced transcript variants. This encoded protein is part of the V0 domain. This gene had the previous symbols of ATP6C and ATP6L.
