= ATP1B1 =

Protein-coding gene in humans

Identifiers
- Aliases: ATP1B1, ATP1B, ATPase Na+/K+ transporting subunit beta 1
- External IDs: OMIM: 182330; MGI: 88108; GeneCards: ATP1B1

Gene location (Human)
Chr.	Chromosome 1 (human)
Band	1q24.2	Start	169,105,697 bp
Band	1q24.2	End	169,310,992 bp

Gene location (Mouse)
Chr.	Chromosome 1 (mouse)
Band	1 H2.2|1 71.75 cM	Start	164,264,678 bp
Band	1 H2.2|1 71.75 cM	End	164,285,924 bp
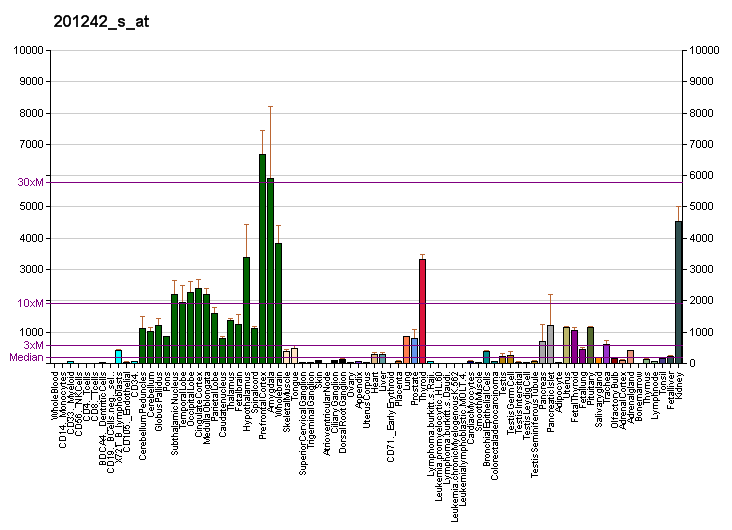

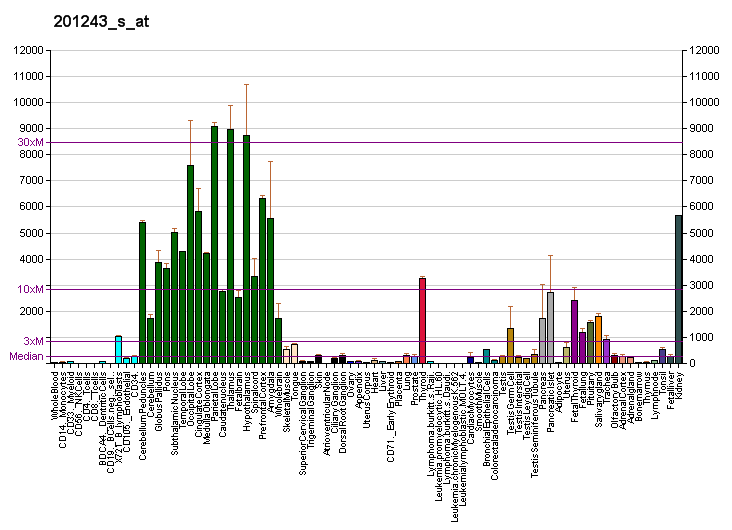
RNA expression pattern
Bgee	Human / Mouse (ortholog); Top expressed in: pars compacta; lateral nuclear group of thalamus; renal medulla; pars reticulata; pons; Epithelium of choroid plexus; superior vestibular nucleus; external globus pallidus; Brodmann area 23; postcentral gyrus / Top expressed in: olfactory tubercle; medial vestibular nucleus; lateral septal nucleus; left colon; amygdala; nucleus accumbens; subiculum; medial dorsal nucleus; cerebellar vermis; prefrontal cortex; More reference expression data
BioGPS	More reference expression data
Gene ontology
Molecular function	ATPase binding; potassium ion binding; sodium ion binding; P-type sodium:potassium-exchanging transporter activity; ATPase activity; protein C-terminus binding; protein binding; MHC class II protein complex binding; ATPase activator activity; ATP binding; protein kinase binding
Cellular component	extracellular vesicle; integral component of membrane; membrane; intercalated disc; myelin sheath; plasma membrane; intracellular anatomical structure; sodium:potassium-exchanging ATPase complex; basolateral plasma membrane; apical plasma membrane; caveola; sarcolemma; extracellular exosome
Biological process	regulation of cardiac conduction; regulation of cardiac muscle contraction by calcium ion signaling; response to hypoxia; positive regulation of ATP-dependent activity; cardiac muscle contraction; positive regulation of sodium ion export across plasma membrane; sodium ion transport; cellular sodium ion homeostasis; sodium ion export across plasma membrane; metal ion transport; cell communication by electrical coupling involved in cardiac conduction; protein stabilization; positive regulation of potassium ion import across plasma membrane; cellular calcium ion homeostasis; ion transport; cellular potassium ion homeostasis; potassium ion transport; membrane repolarization; ion transmembrane transport; ATP metabolic process; cell adhesion; regulation of gene expression; positive regulation of calcium:sodium antiporter activity; protein localization to plasma membrane; membrane repolarization during cardiac muscle cell action potential; relaxation of cardiac muscle; regulation of calcium ion transmembrane transport; leukocyte migration; positive regulation of potassium ion transmembrane transporter activity; protein transport into plasma membrane raft; potassium ion import across plasma membrane; establishment or maintenance of transmembrane electrochemical gradient; transport
Sources:Amigo / QuickGO
Orthologs
Databases	NCBI: entry; OMA: entry
Species	Human	Mouse
Entrez	481	11931
Ensembl	ENSG00000143153	ENSMUSG00000026576
UniProt	P05026	P14094
RefSeq (mRNA)	NM_001677; NM_001001787	NM_009721
RefSeq (protein)	NP_001668	NP_033851
Location (UCSC)	Chr 1: 169.11 – 169.31 Mb	Chr 1: 164.26 – 164.29 Mb
PubMed search
- Wikidata
View/Edit Human	View/Edit Mouse

Sodium/potassium-transporting ATPase subunit beta-1 is an enzyme that in humans is encoded by the ATP1B1 gene.

The protein encoded by this gene belongs to the family of Na^{+}/K^{+} and H^{+}/K^{+} ATPases beta chain proteins, and to the subfamily of Na^{+}/K^{+}-ATPases. Na^{+}/K^{+}-ATPase is an integral membrane protein responsible for establishing and maintaining the electrochemical gradients of Na and K ions across the plasma membrane. These gradients are essential for osmoregulation, for sodium-coupled transport of a variety of organic and inorganic molecules, and for electrical excitability of nerve and muscle. This enzyme is composed of two subunits, a large catalytic subunit (alpha) and a smaller glycoprotein subunit (beta). The beta subunit regulates, through assembly of alpha/beta heterodimers, the number of sodium pumps transported to the plasma membrane. The glycoprotein subunit of Na^{+}/K^{+}-ATPase is encoded by multiple genes. This gene encodes a beta 1 subunit. Alternatively spliced transcript variants encoding different isoforms have been identified.
