= ATP11C =

Protein-coding gene in humans

Identifiers
- Aliases: ATP11C, ATPIG, ATPIQ, ATPase phospholipid transporting 11C, HACXL
- External IDs: OMIM: 300516; MGI: 1859661; GeneCards: ATP11C
Enzyme activity
EC #	BRENDA	ExPASy	KEGG	MetaCyc
7.6.2.1	↗	↗	↗	↗

Gene location (Human)
Chr.	X chromosome (human)
Band	Xq27.1	Start	139,726,346 bp
Band	Xq27.1	End	139,945,276 bp

Gene location (Mouse)
Chr.	X chromosome (mouse)
Band	X|X A6	Start	59,268,650 bp
Band	X|X A6	End	59,636,304 bp
RNA expression pattern
Bgee	Human / Mouse (ortholog); Top expressed in: seminal vesicula; Achilles tendon; testicle; gonad; tail of epididymis; liver; parietal pleura; superficial temporal artery; visceral pleura; right lobe of liver / Top expressed in: liver; secondary oocyte; ganglionic eminence; ventricular zone; granulocyte; tail of embryo; uterus; primary oocyte; thymus; choroid plexus of fourth ventricle; More reference expression data
BioGPS	n/a
Gene ontology
Molecular function	nucleotide binding; metal ion binding; protein binding; hydrolase activity; ATP binding; magnesium ion binding; ATPase-coupled intramembrane lipid transporter activity
Cellular component	integral component of membrane; recycling endosome; endoplasmic reticulum membrane; membrane; plasma membrane; lysosomal membrane; endoplasmic reticulum; trans-Golgi network
Biological process	pre-B cell differentiation; lipid transport; positive regulation of B cell differentiation; phospholipid transport; ion transmembrane transport; phospholipid translocation; transport
Sources:Amigo / QuickGO
Orthologs
Databases	NCBI: entry; OMA: entry
Species	Human	Mouse
Entrez	286410	320940
Ensembl	ENSG00000101974	ENSMUSG00000062949
UniProt	Q8NB49	Q9QZW0
RefSeq (mRNA)	NM_001010986; NM_173694; NM_001353810; NM_001353811; NM_001353812	NM_001001798; NM_001037863; NM_001359002
RefSeq (protein)	NP_001010986; NP_775965; NP_001340739; NP_001340740; NP_001340741	NP_001001798; NP_001032952; NP_001345931
Location (UCSC)	Chr X: 139.73 – 139.95 Mb	Chr X: 59.27 – 59.64 Mb
PubMed search
- Wikidata
View/Edit Human	View/Edit Mouse

ATP11C is an enzyme that in humans is encoded by the ATP11C gene.

== Function ==
ATP11C encodes a member of the Type IV P-type ATPase family that is thought to transport or 'flip' aminophospholipids. The corresponding protein in mice is essential for the development of B cells and red blood cells, and for the prevention of intrahepatic cholestasis.
