= ATP6V1D =

Protein-coding gene in the species Homo sapiens

Identifiers
- Aliases: ATP6V1D, ATP6M, VATD, VMA8, ATPase H+ transporting V1 subunit D
- External IDs: OMIM: 609398; MGI: 1921084; GeneCards: ATP6V1D

Gene location (Human)
| Chr. | Chromosome 14 (human) |
| Band | 14q23.3 | Start | 67,294,371 bp |
| Band | 14q23.3 | End | 67,360,265 bp |

Gene location (Mouse)
| Chr. | Chromosome 12 (mouse) |
| Band | 12 C3|12 35.51 cM | Start | 78,887,499 bp |
| Band | 12 C3|12 35.51 cM | End | 78,908,412 bp |
RNA expression pattern
| Bgee | Human / Mouse (ortholog); Top expressed in: endothelial cell; middle temporal gyrus; Brodmann area 23; pons; lateral nuclear group of thalamus; prefrontal cortex; Brodmann area 9; pars compacta; kidney tubule; superior vestibular nucleus / Top expressed in: motor neuron; facial motor nucleus; Epithelium of choroid plexus; vestibular membrane of cochlear duct; substantia nigra; nucleus accumbens; temporal lobe; amygdala; prefrontal cortex; retinal pigment epithelium; More reference expression data |
| BioGPS | n/a |
Gene ontology
| Molecular function | ATPase-coupled transmembrane transporter activity; protein binding; proton-transporting ATPase activity, rotational mechanism |
| Cellular component | cytosol; centrosome; membrane; cilium; lysosomal membrane; proton-transporting V-type ATPase complex; extracellular exosome; plasma membrane; specific granule membrane |
| Biological process | insulin receptor signaling pathway; transferrin transport; ion transport; ion transmembrane transport; cell projection organization; protein localization to cilium; regulation of macroautophagy; phagosome acidification; neutrophil degranulation; cilium assembly; transport; proton transmembrane transport; transmembrane transport |
Sources:Amigo / QuickGO
Orthologs
| Databases | NCBI: entry; OMA: entry |
| Species | Human | Mouse |
| Entrez | 51382 | 73834 |
| Ensembl | ENSG00000100554 | ENSMUSG00000021114 |
| UniProt | Q9Y5K8 | P57746 |
| RefSeq (mRNA) | NM_015994 | NM_023721 |
| RefSeq (protein) | NP_057078; NP_057078.1 | NP_076210 |
| Location (UCSC) | Chr 14: 67.29 – 67.36 Mb | Chr 12: 78.89 – 78.91 Mb |
| PubMed search |
- Wikidata
| View/Edit Human | View/Edit Mouse |

V-type proton ATPase subunit D is an enzyme that in humans is encoded by the ATP6V1D gene.

This gene encodes a component of vacuolar ATPase (V-ATPase), a multisubunit enzyme that mediates acidification of eukaryotic intracellular organelles. V-ATPase dependent organelle acidification is necessary for such intracellular processes as protein sorting, zymogen activation, receptor-mediated endocytosis, and synaptic vesicle proton gradient generation. V-ATPase is composed of a cytosolic V1 domain and a transmembrane V0 domain. The V1 domain consists of three A and three B subunits, two G subunits plus the C, D, E, F, and H subunits. The V1 domain contains the ATP catalytic site. The V0 domain consists of five different subunits: a, c, c', c", and d. Additional isoforms of many of the V1 and V0 subunit proteins are encoded by multiple genes or alternatively spliced transcript variants. This gene encodes the V1 domain D subunit protein.
