= ATP5S =

Protein-coding gene in humans

DMAC2L

Identifiers
- Aliases: DMAC2L, ATPW, FB, HSU79253, ATP synthase, H+ transporting, mitochondrial Fo complex subunit s (factor B), ATP5S, distal membrane arm assembly complex 2 like, distal membrane arm assembly component 2 like
- External IDs: MGI: 1915305; GeneCards: DMAC2L

Gene location (Human)
Chr.	Chromosome 14 (human)
Band	14q21.3	Start	50,312,324 bp
Band	14q21.3	End	50,335,558 bp

Gene location (Mouse)
Chr.	Chromosome 12 (mouse)
Band	12|12 C2	Start	69,771,724 bp
Band	12|12 C2	End	69,791,434 bp
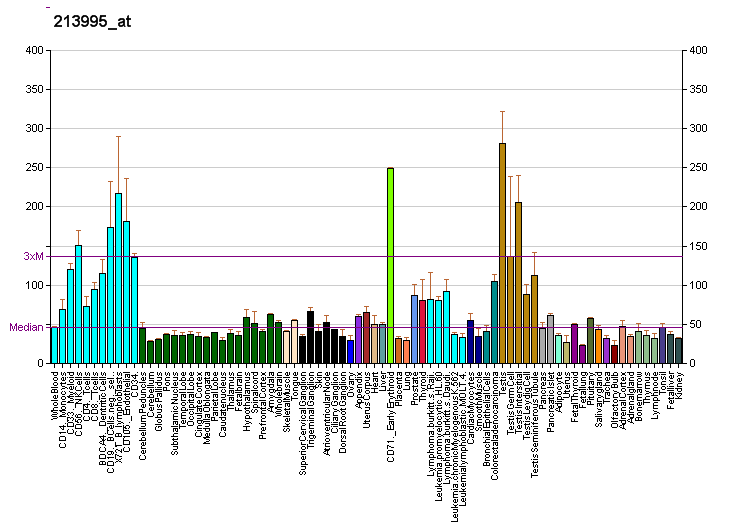
RNA expression pattern
Bgee	Human / Mouse (ortholog); Top expressed in: sperm; right uterine tube; Skeletal muscle tissue of biceps brachii; endothelial cell; triceps brachii muscle; glutes; oocyte; thoracic diaphragm; skin of thigh; right ventricle / Top expressed in: interventricular septum; spermatid; right ventricle; right kidney; spermatocyte; sternocleidomastoid muscle; digastric muscle; myocardium of ventricle; triceps brachii muscle; temporal muscle; More reference expression data
BioGPS	More reference expression data
Gene ontology
Molecular function	proton transmembrane transporter activity; metal ion binding
Cellular component	mitochondrion; membrane; proton-transporting ATP synthase complex, coupling factor F(o); mitochondrial inner membrane
Biological process	ion transport; ATP biosynthetic process; cristae formation; proton transmembrane transport; mitochondrial ATP synthesis coupled proton transport
Sources:Amigo / QuickGO
Orthologs
Databases	NCBI: entry; OMA: entry
Species	Human	Mouse
Entrez	27109	68055
Ensembl	ENSG00000125375	ENSMUSG00000054894
UniProt	Q99766	Q9CRA7
RefSeq (mRNA)	NM_001003803; NM_001003805; NM_015684; NM_001370605; NM_001382507 NM_001382509; NM_001382510	NM_026536; NM_001361690; NM_001361691
RefSeq (protein)	NP_001003803; NP_001003805; NP_056499; NP_001357534; NP_001369436 NP_001369438; NP_001369439	NP_080812; NP_001348619; NP_001348620
Location (UCSC)	Chr 14: 50.31 – 50.34 Mb	Chr 12: 69.77 – 69.79 Mb
PubMed search
- Wikidata
View/Edit Human	View/Edit Mouse

ATP synthase subunit s, mitochondrial (or ATP5S) is an enzyme that in humans is encoded by the ATP5S gene (officially designated DMAC2L).

This gene encodes a subunit of mitochondrial ATP synthase. Mitochondrial ATP synthase catalyzes ATP synthesis, utilizing an electrochemical gradient of protons across the inner membrane during oxidative phosphorylation. ATP synthase is composed of two linked multi-subunit complexes: the soluble catalytic core, F1, and the membrane-spanning component, Fo, comprising the proton channel. This gene encodes the subunit s, also known as factor B, of the proton channel. This subunit is necessary for the energy transduction activity of the ATP synthase complexes. Alternatively spliced transcript variants encoding different isoforms have been identified.
