= ATP6V1C1 =

Protein-coding gene in the species Homo sapiens

Identifiers
- Aliases: ATP6V1C1, ATP6C, ATP6D, VATC, Vma5, ATPase H+ transporting V1 subunit C1
- External IDs: OMIM: 603097; MGI: 1913585; GeneCards: ATP6V1C1

Gene location (Human)
Chr.	Chromosome 8 (human)
Band	8q22.3	Start	103,021,063 bp
Band	8q22.3	End	103,073,051 bp

Gene location (Mouse)
Chr.	Chromosome 15 (mouse)
Band	15|15 B3.1	Start	38,662,177 bp
Band	15|15 B3.1	End	38,692,690 bp
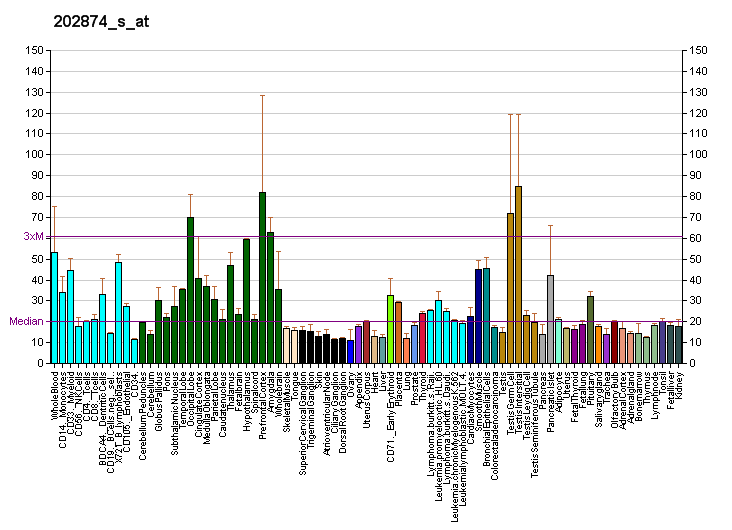

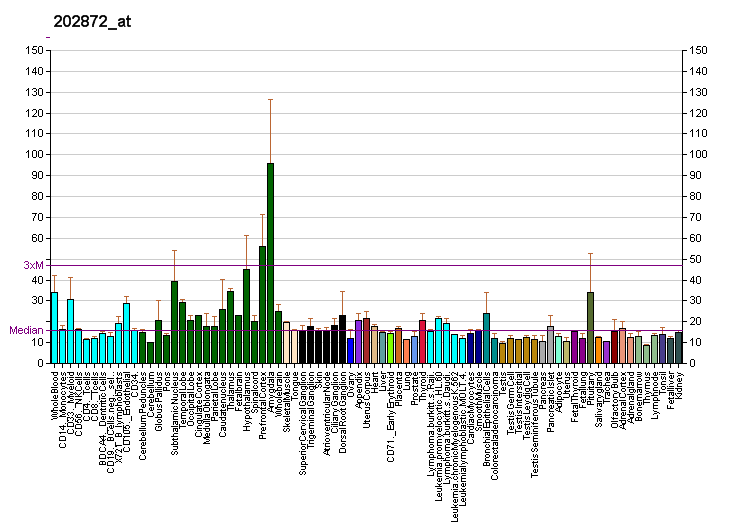

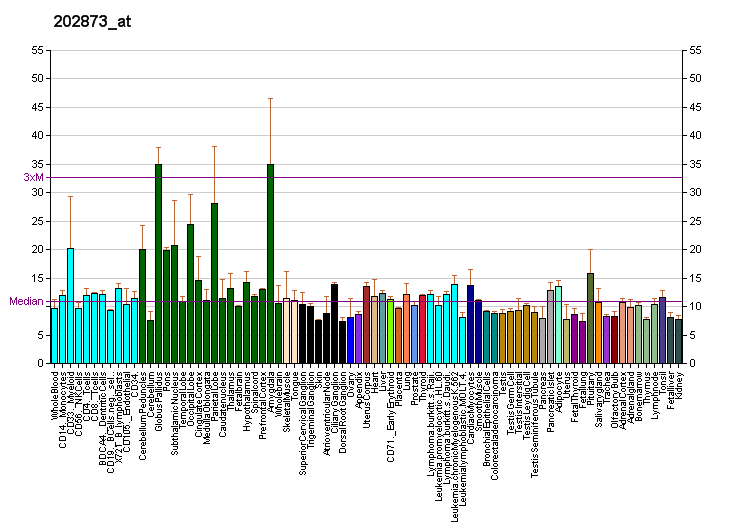
RNA expression pattern
Bgee	Human / Mouse (ortholog); Top expressed in: sperm; lateral nuclear group of thalamus; prefrontal cortex; islet of Langerhans; superior frontal gyrus; middle temporal gyrus; pars compacta; Brodmann area 23; pons; Brodmann area 9 / Top expressed in: hippocampus proper; dentate gyrus of hippocampal formation granule cell; yolk sac; primary visual cortex; hypothalamus; superior frontal gyrus; cerebellar cortex; olfactory bulb; striatum of neuraxis; right kidney; More reference expression data
BioGPS	More reference expression data
Gene ontology
Molecular function	transporter activity; proton-transporting ATPase activity, rotational mechanism; protein binding; proton transmembrane transporter activity; P-type proton-exporting transporter activity
Cellular component	cytoplasm; proton-transporting V-type ATPase, V1 domain; cytosol; plasma membrane; proton-transporting two-sector ATPase complex; apical part of cell; lysosomal membrane; extracellular exosome; cytoplasmic vesicle; vacuolar proton-transporting V-type ATPase, V1 domain
Biological process	insulin receptor signaling pathway; transferrin transport; ion transport; ion transmembrane transport; regulation of macroautophagy; phagosome acidification; transport; proton transmembrane transport
Sources:Amigo / QuickGO
Orthologs
Databases	NCBI: entry; OMA: entry
Species	Human	Mouse
Entrez	528	66335
Ensembl	ENSG00000155097	ENSMUSG00000022295
UniProt	P21283	Q9Z1G3
RefSeq (mRNA)	NM_001695; NM_001007254	NM_025494
RefSeq (protein)	NP_001686	NP_079770
Location (UCSC)	Chr 8: 103.02 – 103.07 Mb	Chr 15: 38.66 – 38.69 Mb
PubMed search
- Wikidata
View/Edit Human	View/Edit Mouse

V-type proton ATPase subunit C 1 is an enzyme that in humans is encoded by the ATP6V1C1 gene.

This gene encodes a component of vacuolar ATPase (V-ATPase), a multisubunit enzyme that mediates acidification of intracellular compartments of eukaryotic cells. V-ATPase dependent acidification is necessary for such intracellular processes as protein sorting, zymogen activation, receptor-mediated endocytosis, and synaptic vesicle proton gradient generation. V-ATPase is composed of a cytosolic V1 domain and a transmembrane V0 domain. The V1 domain consists of three A and three B subunits, two G subunits plus the C, D, E, F, and H subunits. The V1 domain contains the ATP catalytic site. The V0 domain consists of five different subunits: a, c, c', c'', and d. Additional isoforms of many of the V1 and V0 subunit proteins are encoded by multiple genes or alternatively spliced transcript variants. This gene is one of two genes that encode the V1 domain C subunit proteins and is found ubiquitously. This C subunit is analogous but not homologous to gamma subunit of F-ATPases. Previously, this gene was designated ATP6D.

In melanocytic cells ATP6V1C1 gene expression may be regulated by MITF.
