= ATP11B =

Protein-coding gene in the species Homo sapiens

Identifiers
- Aliases: ATP11B, ATPIF, ATPIR, ATPase phospholipid transporting 11B (putative)
- External IDs: OMIM: 605869; MGI: 1923545; GeneCards: ATP11B
Enzyme activity
EC #	BRENDA	ExPASy	KEGG	MetaCyc
7.6.2.1	↗	↗	↗	↗

Gene location (Human)
Chr.	Chromosome 3 (human)
Band	3q26.33	Start	182,793,503 bp
Band	3q26.33	End	182,921,629 bp

Gene location (Mouse)
Chr.	Chromosome 3 (mouse)
Band	3|3 B	Start	35,808,255 bp
Band	3|3 B	End	35,910,425 bp
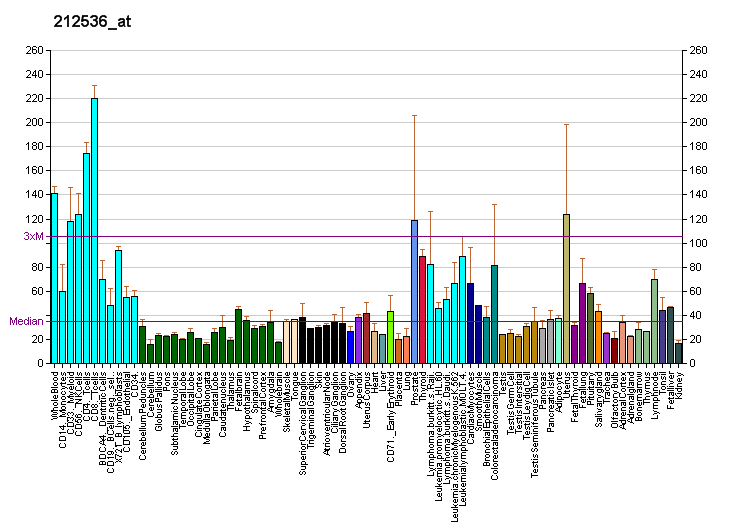

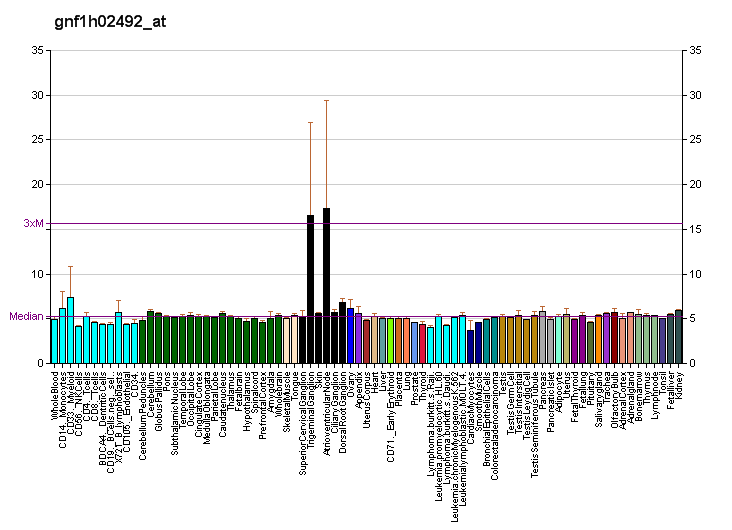

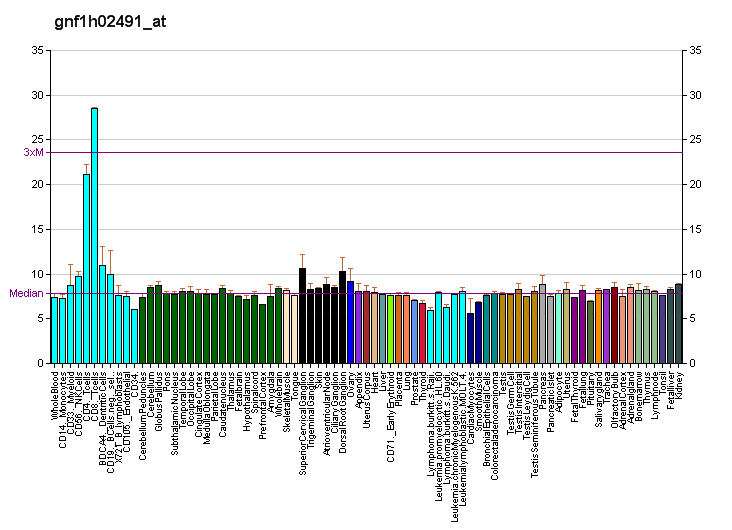
RNA expression pattern
Bgee	Human / Mouse (ortholog); Top expressed in: Achilles tendon; epithelium of colon; bone marrow cell; sperm; gingival epithelium; secondary oocyte; Skeletal muscle tissue of rectus abdominis; oral cavity; tonsil; germinal epithelium / Top expressed in: neural layer of retina; granulocyte; cumulus cell; large intestine; colon; left colon; epithelium of small intestine; pyloric antrum; blood; jejunum; More reference expression data
BioGPS	More reference expression data
Gene ontology
Molecular function	nucleotide binding; ion transmembrane transporter activity; metal ion binding; protein binding; ATPase-coupled intramembrane lipid transporter activity; hydrolase activity; ATP binding; magnesium ion binding
Cellular component	integral component of membrane; recycling endosome; endosome; Golgi apparatus; membrane; plasma membrane; nuclear inner membrane; recycling endosome membrane; early endosome; endoplasmic reticulum; azurophil granule membrane; trans-Golgi network
Biological process	lipid transport; aminophospholipid transport; phospholipid transport; ion transport; ion transmembrane transport; phospholipid translocation; neutrophil degranulation; transport
Sources:Amigo / QuickGO
Orthologs
Databases	NCBI: entry; OMA: entry
Species	Human	Mouse
Entrez	23200	76295
Ensembl	ENSG00000058063	ENSMUSG00000037400
UniProt	Q9Y2G3	Q6DFW5
RefSeq (mRNA)	NM_014616	NM_029570
RefSeq (protein)	NP_055431	NP_083846
Location (UCSC)	Chr 3: 182.79 – 182.92 Mb	Chr 3: 35.81 – 35.91 Mb
PubMed search
- Wikidata
View/Edit Human	View/Edit Mouse

Probable phospholipid-transporting ATPase IF is an enzyme encoded by the ATP11B gene in humans.

== Function ==
P-type ATPases, such as ATP11B, are phosphorylated in their intermediate state and drive uphill transport of ions across membranes. Several subfamilies of P-type ATPases have been identified. One subfamily transports heavy metal ions, such as Cu(2+) or Cd(2+). Another subfamily transports non-heavy metal ions, such as H(+), Na(+), K(+), or Ca(+). A third subfamily transports amphipaths, such as phosphatidylserine.
