= ATP8B3 =

Protein-coding gene in the species Homo sapiens

Identifiers
- Aliases: ATP8B3, ATPIK, ATPase phospholipid transporting 8B3
- External IDs: OMIM: 605866; MGI: 1914581; GeneCards: ATP8B3
Enzyme activity
EC #	BRENDA	ExPASy	KEGG	MetaCyc
7.6.2.1	↗	↗	↗	↗

Gene location (Human)
Chr.	Chromosome 19 (human)
Band	19p13.3	Start	1,782,075 bp
Band	19p13.3	End	1,812,276 bp

Gene location (Mouse)
Chr.	Chromosome 10 (mouse)
Band	10|10 C1	Start	80,355,418 bp
Band	10|10 C1	End	80,374,958 bp
RNA expression pattern
Bgee	Human / Mouse (ortholog); Top expressed in: left testis; right testis; buccal mucosa cell; stromal cell of endometrium; right adrenal gland; right adrenal cortex; granulocyte; testicle; left adrenal gland; left adrenal cortex / Top expressed in: spermatid; spermatocyte; seminiferous tubule; olfactory epithelium; embryo; facial motor nucleus; epiblast; islet of Langerhans; tail of embryo; anterior horn of spinal cord; More reference expression data
BioGPS	n/a
Gene ontology
Molecular function	nucleotide binding; metal ion binding; ATPase-coupled intramembrane lipid transporter activity; hydrolase activity; ATP binding; magnesium ion binding
Cellular component	integral component of membrane; Golgi apparatus; endoplasmic reticulum membrane; membrane; plasma membrane; acrosomal membrane; endoplasmic reticulum; cytoplasmic vesicle; acrosomal vesicle
Biological process	lipid transport; Golgi organization; phospholipid transport; phospholipid translocation; binding of sperm to zona pellucida
Sources:Amigo / QuickGO
Orthologs
Databases	NCBI: entry; OMA: entry
Species	Human	Mouse
Entrez	148229	67331
Ensembl	ENSG00000130270	ENSMUSG00000003341
UniProt	O60423	Q6UQ17
RefSeq (mRNA)	NM_001178002; NM_138813	NM_026094
RefSeq (protein)	NP_001171473; NP_620168	NP_080370
Location (UCSC)	Chr 19: 1.78 – 1.81 Mb	Chr 10: 80.36 – 80.37 Mb
PubMed search
- Wikidata
View/Edit Human	View/Edit Mouse

The human gene ATP8B3 encodes the protein ATPase, aminophospholipid transporter, class I, type 8B, member 3.

== Transcript ==
Alternatively spliced transcript variants encoding different isoforms have been found for this gene.

== Protein ==
The protein encoded by this gene belongs to the family of P-type cation transport ATPases, and to the subfamily of aminophospholipid-transporting ATPases. The aminophospholipid translocases transport phosphatidylserine and phosphatidylethanolamine from one side of a bilayer to another. This gene encodes the member 3 of the phospholipid-transporting ATPase 8B.
