= ATP6V1E2 =

Protein-coding gene in humans

Identifiers
- Aliases: ATP6V1E2, ATP6E1, ATP6EL2, ATP6V1EL2, VMA4, ATPase H+ transporting V1 subunit E2
- External IDs: OMIM: 617385; MGI: 1922165; GeneCards: ATP6V1E2

Gene location (Human)
Chr.	Chromosome 2 (human)
Band	2p21|2p16-p12	Start	46,490,750 bp
Band	2p21|2p16-p12	End	46,542,577 bp

Gene location (Mouse)
Chr.	Chromosome 17 (mouse)
Band	17|17 E4	Start	87,251,537 bp
Band	17|17 E4	End	87,255,325 bp
RNA expression pattern
Bgee	Human / Mouse (ortholog); Top expressed in: sperm; right testis; left testis; gonad; islet of Langerhans; white blood cell; monocyte; testicle; C1 segment; muscle of thigh / Top expressed in: seminiferous tubule; spermatid; submandibular gland; spermatocyte; gastrula; mucosa of small intestine; lumbar spinal ganglion; medial ganglionic eminence; right ventricle; lumbar subsegment of spinal cord; More reference expression data
BioGPS	n/a
Gene ontology
Molecular function	P-type proton-exporting transporter activity; protein binding; proton-transporting ATPase activity, rotational mechanism
Cellular component	cytosol; acrosomal vesicle; proton-transporting two-sector ATPase complex, catalytic domain
Biological process	insulin receptor signaling pathway; ion transmembrane transport; ion transport; transferrin transport; regulation of macroautophagy; phagosome acidification
Sources:Amigo / QuickGO
Orthologs
Databases	NCBI: entry; OMA: entry
Species	Human	Mouse
Entrez	90423	74915
Ensembl	ENSG00000250565	ENSMUSG00000053375
UniProt	Q96A05	Q9D593
RefSeq (mRNA)	NM_080653; NM_001318063; NM_001371281; NM_001371282; NM_001371283	NM_029121
RefSeq (protein)	NP_001304992; NP_001358210; NP_001358211; NP_001358212	NP_083397
Location (UCSC)	Chr 2: 46.49 – 46.54 Mb	Chr 17: 87.25 – 87.26 Mb
PubMed search
- Wikidata
View/Edit Human	View/Edit Mouse

V-type proton ATPase subunit E 2 is an enzyme that in humans is encoded by the ATP6V1E2 gene.
