= ATP2A3 =

Protein-coding gene in the species Homo sapiens

Identifiers
- Aliases: ATP2A3, SERCA3, ATPase sarcoplasmic/endoplasmic reticulum Ca2+ transporting 3
- External IDs: OMIM: 601929; MGI: 1194503; GeneCards: ATP2A3
Enzyme activity
EC #	BRENDA	ExPASy	KEGG	MetaCyc
7.2.2.10	↗	↗	↗	↗

Gene location (Human)
Chr.	Chromosome 17 (human)
Band	17p13.2	Start	3,923,870 bp
Band	17p13.2	End	3,964,464 bp

Gene location (Mouse)
Chr.	Chromosome 11 (mouse)
Band	11|11 B4	Start	72,851,995 bp
Band	11|11 B4	End	72,883,870 bp
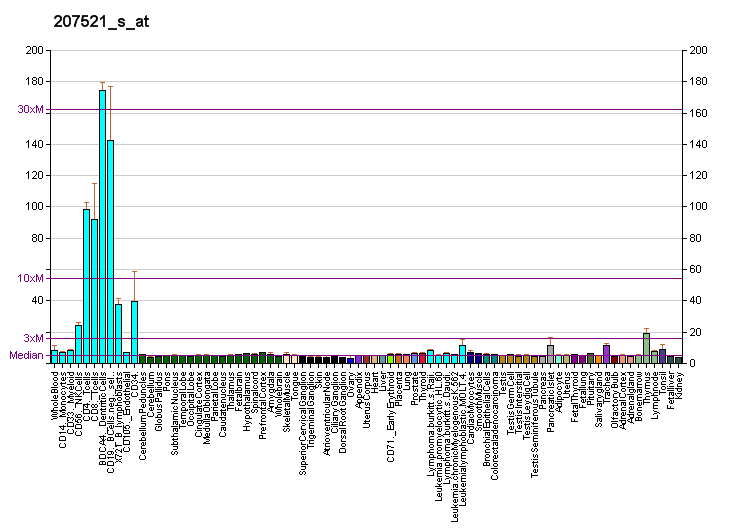

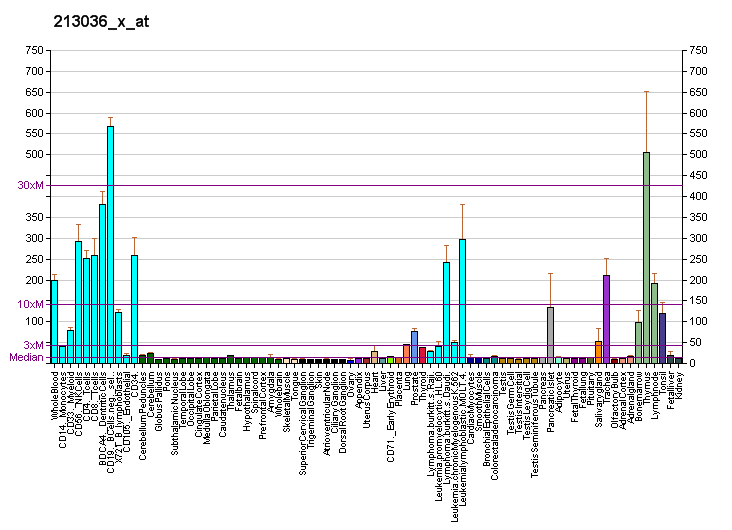

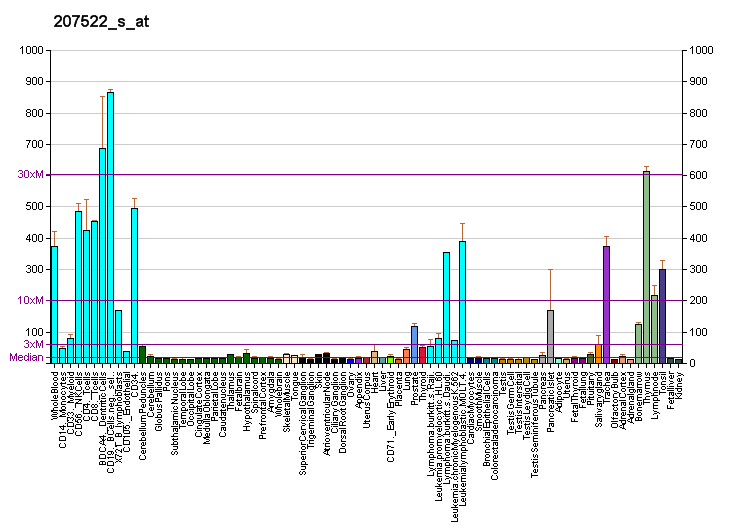
RNA expression pattern
Bgee	Human / Mouse (ortholog); Top expressed in: granulocyte; olfactory zone of nasal mucosa; spleen; mucosa of transverse colon; thymus; lymph node; blood; bone marrow cell; beta cell; appendix / Top expressed in: submandibular gland; parotid gland; granulocyte; islet of Langerhans; pyloric antrum; crypt of lieberkuhn of small intestine; colon; left colon; thymus; tibiofemoral joint; More reference expression data
BioGPS	More reference expression data
Gene ontology
Molecular function	nucleotide binding; P-type calcium transporter activity; metal ion binding; hydrolase activity; ATP binding; P-type proton-exporting transporter activity
Cellular component	integral component of membrane; nuclear membrane; endoplasmic reticulum membrane; membrane; sarcoplasmic reticulum; platelet dense tubular network membrane; endoplasmic reticulum; nucleus; sarcoplasmic reticulum membrane
Biological process	regulation of cardiac conduction; ion transport; ion transmembrane transport; calcium ion transmembrane transport; calcium ion transport; cellular calcium ion homeostasis; proton transmembrane transport
Sources:Amigo / QuickGO
Orthologs
Databases	NCBI: entry; OMA: entry
Species	Human	Mouse
Entrez	489	53313
Ensembl	ENSG00000074370	ENSMUSG00000020788
UniProt	Q93084	Q64518
RefSeq (mRNA)	NM_005173; NM_174953; NM_174954; NM_174955; NM_174956 NM_174957; NM_174958	NM_001163336; NM_001163337; NM_016745
RefSeq (protein)	NP_005164; NP_777613; NP_777614; NP_777615; NP_777616 NP_777617; NP_777618	NP_001156808; NP_001156809; NP_058025
Location (UCSC)	Chr 17: 3.92 – 3.96 Mb	Chr 11: 72.85 – 72.88 Mb
PubMed search
- Wikidata
View/Edit Human	View/Edit Mouse

Sarcoplasmic/endoplasmic reticulum calcium ATPase 3 is an enzyme that in humans is encoded by the ATP2A3 gene.

This gene encodes one of the SERCA Ca^{2+}-ATPases, which are intracellular pumps located in the sarcoplasmic or endoplasmic reticula of cells. SERCA3 expression was originally described as non-muscular, but was recently observed in cardiomyocyte. This enzyme catalyzes the hydrolysis of ATP coupled with the translocation of calcium from the cytosol to the sarcoplasmic reticulum lumen, and is involved in calcium sequestration associated with muscular excitation and contraction. Alternative splicing results in 6 transcript variants encoding different isoforms named SERCA3a to SERCA3f.

== Cancer ==
ATP2A3 gene has been observed progressively downregulated in Human papillomavirus-positive neoplastic keratinocytes derived from uterine cervical preneoplastic lesions at different levels of malignancy. For this reason, ATP2A3 is likely to be associated with tumorigenesis and may be a potential prognostic marker for uterine cervical preneoplastic lesions progression.
