= ATP13A3 =

Protein-coding gene in the species Homo sapiens

Identifiers
- Aliases: ATP13A3, AFURS1, ATPase 13A3
- External IDs: OMIM: 610232; MGI: 2685387; GeneCards: ATP13A3
Enzyme activity
EC #	BRENDA	ExPASy	KEGG	MetaCyc
7.6.2.16	↗	↗	↗	↗

Gene location (Human)
Chr.	Chromosome 3 (human)
Band	3q29	Start	194,402,672 bp
Band	3q29	End	194,498,364 bp

Gene location (Mouse)
Chr.	Chromosome 16 (mouse)
Band	16|16 B2	Start	30,131,241 bp
Band	16|16 B2	End	30,224,793 bp
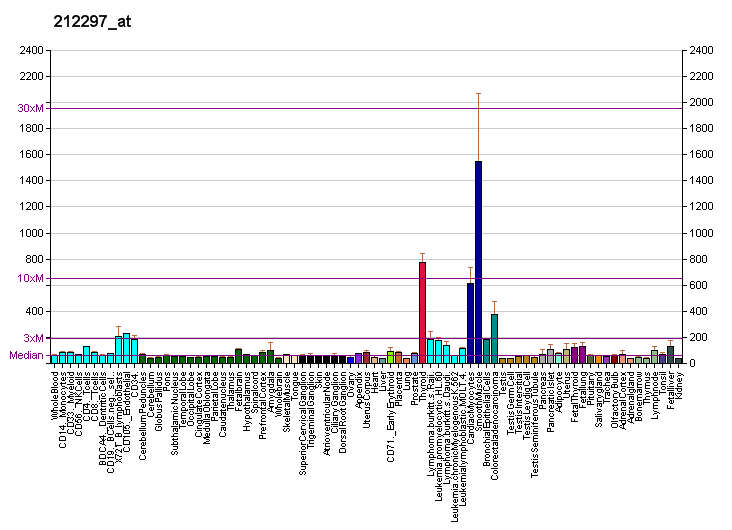

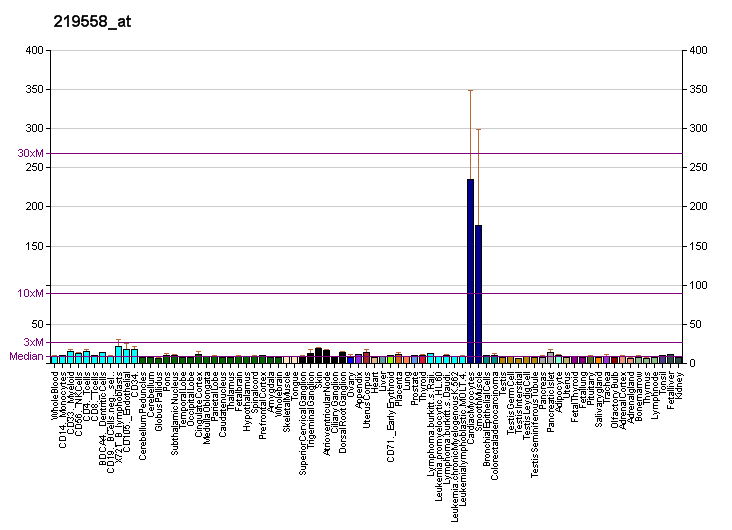
RNA expression pattern
Bgee	Human / Mouse (ortholog); Top expressed in: decidua; secondary oocyte; amniotic fluid; cartilage tissue; palpebral conjunctiva; epithelium of colon; germinal epithelium; Epithelium of choroid plexus; parietal pleura; islet of Langerhans / Top expressed in: secondary oocyte; parotid gland; left lung lobe; migratory enteric neural crest cell; cumulus cell; Paneth cell; tail of embryo; primary oocyte; zygote; left colon; More reference expression data
BioGPS	More reference expression data
Gene ontology
Molecular function	nucleotide binding; ATPase activity; hydrolase activity; ATP binding; metal ion binding; P-type calcium transporter activity
Cellular component	integral component of membrane; integral component of plasma membrane; membrane; intracellular membrane-bounded organelle
Biological process	cation transport; cellular calcium ion homeostasis; calcium ion transmembrane transport
Sources:Amigo / QuickGO
Orthologs
Databases	NCBI: entry; OMA: entry
Species	Human	Mouse
Entrez	79572	224088
Ensembl	ENSG00000133657	ENSMUSG00000022533
UniProt	Q9H7F0	Q5XF89
RefSeq (mRNA)	NM_024524; NM_001367549; NM_001374836	NM_001128094; NM_001128096
RefSeq (protein)	NP_078800; NP_001354478; NP_001361765	NP_001121566; NP_001121568
Location (UCSC)	Chr 3: 194.4 – 194.5 Mb	Chr 16: 30.13 – 30.22 Mb
PubMed search
- Wikidata
View/Edit Human	View/Edit Mouse

Probable cation-transporting ATPase 13A3 is an enzyme that in humans is encoded by the ATP13A3 gene.
