= ATP6V1G1 =

Protein-coding gene in the species Homo sapiens

Identifiers
- Aliases: ATP6V1G1, ATP6G, ATP6G1, ATP6GL, ATP6J, Vma10, ATPase H+ transporting V1 subunit G1
- External IDs: OMIM: 607296; MGI: 1913540; GeneCards: ATP6V1G1

Gene location (Human)
Chr.	Chromosome 9 (human)
Band	9q32	Start	114,587,706 bp
Band	9q32	End	114,598,915 bp

Gene location (Mouse)
Chr.	Chromosome 4 (mouse)
Band	4|4 B3	Start	63,463,009 bp
Band	4|4 B3	End	63,468,987 bp
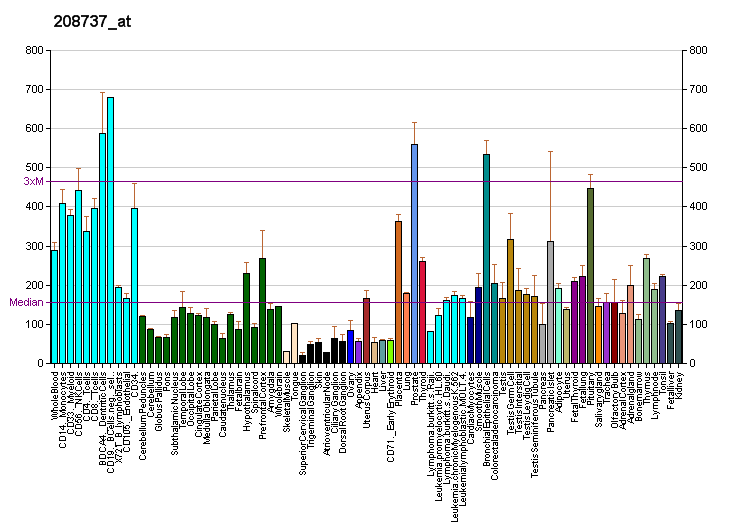
RNA expression pattern
Bgee	Human / Mouse (ortholog); Top expressed in: renal medulla; pylorus; cardia; ganglionic eminence; olfactory zone of nasal mucosa; retinal pigment epithelium; corpus epididymis; anterior pituitary; gonad; oral cavity / Top expressed in: granulocyte; yolk sac; muscle of thigh; right kidney; spermatocyte; lip; ventricular zone; neural layer of retina; dentate gyrus of hippocampal formation granule cell; blastocyst; More reference expression data
BioGPS	More reference expression data
Gene ontology
Molecular function	ATPase binding; ATPase activity; P-type proton-exporting transporter activity; protein binding; ATPase-coupled transmembrane transporter activity
Cellular component	cytosol; plasma membrane; intracellular anatomical structure; lysosomal membrane; vacuolar proton-transporting V-type ATPase complex; extracellular exosome
Biological process	insulin receptor signaling pathway; transferrin transport; proton transmembrane transport; ion transport; ion transmembrane transport; regulation of macroautophagy; phagosome acidification; cellular iron ion homeostasis; cellular response to increased oxygen levels; transport
Sources:Amigo / QuickGO
Orthologs
Databases	NCBI: entry; OMA: entry
Species	Human	Mouse
Entrez	9550	66290
Ensembl	ENSG00000136888	ENSMUSG00000039105
UniProt	O75348	Q9CR51
RefSeq (mRNA)	NM_004888	NM_024173
RefSeq (protein)	NP_004879; NP_004879.1	NP_077135
Location (UCSC)	Chr 9: 114.59 – 114.6 Mb	Chr 4: 63.46 – 63.47 Mb
PubMed search
- Wikidata
View/Edit Human	View/Edit Mouse

V-type proton ATPase subunit G 1 is an enzyme that in humans is encoded by the ATP6V1G1 gene.

This gene encodes a component of vacuolar ATPase (V-ATPase), a multisubunit enzyme that mediates acidification of eukaryotic intracellular organelles. V-ATPase dependent organelle acidification is necessary for such intracellular processes as protein sorting, zymogen activation, receptor-mediated endocytosis, and synaptic vesicle proton gradient generation. V-ATPase is composed of a cytosolic V1 domain and a transmembrane V0 domain. The V1 domain consists of three A, three B, and two G subunits, as well as a C, D, E, F, and H subunit. The V1 domain contains the ATP catalytic site. The protein encoded by this gene is one of three V1 domain G subunit proteins. Pseudogenes of this gene have been characterized.
