= ATPase, H+ transporting, lysosomal V0 subunit a1 =

Protein-coding gene in the species Homo sapiens

ATP6V0A1

Identifiers
- Aliases: ATP6V0A1, Atp6v0a1, AA959968, ATP6a1, Atp6n1, Atp6n1a, Atpv0a1, Vpp-1, Vpp1, Stv1, Vph1, a1, ATPase, H+ transporting, lysosomal V0 subunit a1, ATP6N1, ATP6N1A, VPP1, ATPase H+ transporting V0 subunit a1
- External IDs: OMIM: 192130; MGI: 103286; GeneCards: ATP6V0A1

Gene location (Human)
Chr.	Chromosome 17 (human)
Band	17q21.2	Start	42,458,844 bp
Band	17q21.2	End	42,522,611 bp

Gene location (Mouse)
Chr.	Chromosome 11 (mouse)
Band	11 D|11 64.04 cM	Start	100,900,278 bp
Band	11 D|11 64.04 cM	End	100,954,545 bp
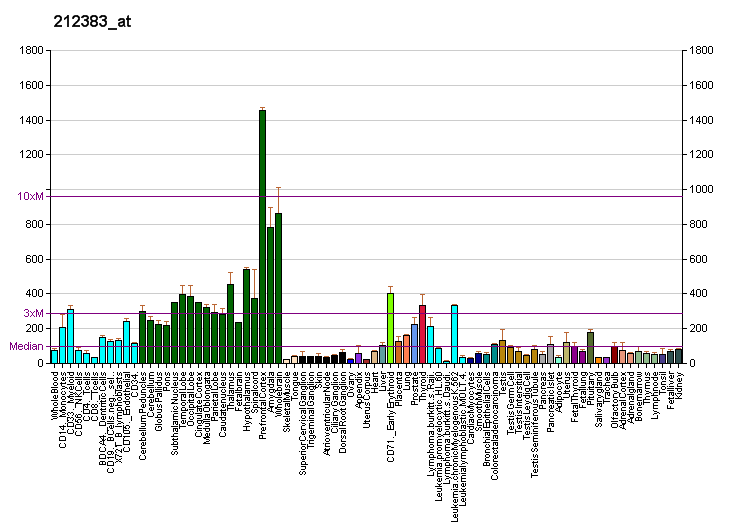

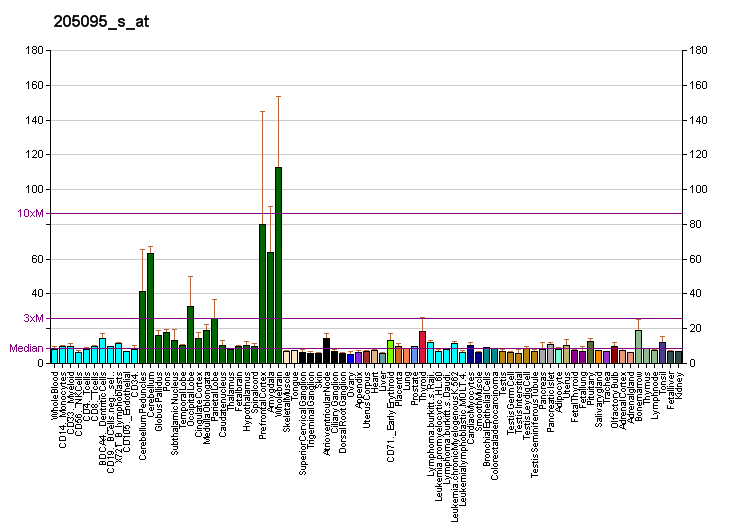
RNA expression pattern
Bgee	Human / Mouse (ortholog); Top expressed in: right frontal lobe; right hemisphere of cerebellum; prefrontal cortex; cingulate gyrus; anterior cingulate cortex; Brodmann area 9; anterior pituitary; nucleus accumbens; C1 segment; hypothalamus / Top expressed in: superior frontal gyrus; dentate gyrus of hippocampal formation granule cell; primary visual cortex; subiculum; cerebellar cortex; perirhinal cortex; piriform cortex; neural layer of retina; dorsomedial hypothalamic nucleus; entorhinal cortex; More reference expression data
BioGPS	More reference expression data
Gene ontology
Molecular function	ATPase binding; proton-transporting ATPase activity, rotational mechanism; protein binding; proton transmembrane transporter activity
Cellular component	integral component of membrane; proton-transporting V-type ATPase, V0 domain; phagocytic vesicle membrane; Golgi apparatus; intracellular membrane-bounded organelle; membrane; vacuolar proton-transporting V-type ATPase, V0 domain; melanosome; vacuolar proton-transporting V-type ATPase complex; endosome membrane; extracellular exosome; cytoplasmic vesicle membrane; cytoplasmic vesicle; cytoplasm; cytosol; plasma membrane; nuclear speck; secretory granule membrane; ficolin-1-rich granule membrane; lysosomal membrane; intracellular organelle; perinuclear region of cytoplasm
Biological process	insulin receptor signaling pathway; transferrin transport; vacuolar proton-transporting V-type ATPase complex assembly; toxin transport; ion transport; ion transmembrane transport; ATP synthesis coupled proton transport; regulation of macroautophagy; vacuolar acidification; phagosome acidification; neutrophil degranulation; transport
Sources:Amigo / QuickGO
Orthologs
Databases	NCBI: entry; OMA: entry
Species	Human	Mouse
Entrez	535	11975
Ensembl	ENSG00000033627	ENSMUSG00000019302
UniProt	Q93050	Q9Z1G4
RefSeq (mRNA)	NM_001130020; NM_001130021; NM_005177	NM_001243049; NM_001243050; NM_001243051; NM_016920; NM_001362636 NM_001362637; NM_001362638; NM_001362639; NM_001362640; NM_001362641
RefSeq (protein)	NP_001123492; NP_001123493; NP_005168; NP_001365451; NP_001365452 NP_001365459; NP_001365460; NP_001365461; NP_001365462; NP_001365463; NP_001365464; NP_001365465; NP_001365466; NP_001365467; NP_001365468; NP_001365469; NP_001365470; NP_001365471; NP_001365472; NP_001365473; NP_001365474; NP_001365475; NP_001365476; NP_001365477; NP_001365478; NP_001365479; NP_001365480; NP_001365481; NP_001365483; NP_001365485; NP_001365486	NP_001229978; NP_001229979; NP_001229980; NP_058616; NP_001349565 NP_001349566; NP_001349567; NP_001349568; NP_001349569; NP_001349570
Location (UCSC)	Chr 17: 42.46 – 42.52 Mb	Chr 11: 100.9 – 100.95 Mb
PubMed search
- Wikidata
View/Edit Human	View/Edit Mouse

V-type proton ATPase 116 kDa subunit a isoform 1 is an enzyme that in humans is encoded by the ATP6V0A1 gene.

This gene encodes a component of vacuolar ATPase (V-ATPase), a multisubunit enzyme that mediates acidification of eukaryotic intracellular organelles. V-ATPase dependent organelle acidification is necessary for such intracellular processes as protein sorting, zymogen activation, receptor-mediated endocytosis, and synaptic vesicle proton gradient generation. V-ATPase is composed of a cytosolic V1 domain and a transmembrane V0 domain. The V1 domain consists of three A and three B subunits, two G subunits plus the C, D, E, F, and H subunits. The V1 domain contains the ATP catalytic site. The V0 domain consists of five different subunits: a, c, c', c", and d. Additional isoforms of many of the V1 and V0 subunit proteins are encoded by multiple genes or alternatively spliced transcript variants. This gene encodes one of three A subunit proteins and the encoded protein is associated with clathrin-coated vesicles. The occurrence of splice variants encoding different protein products has been reported, but the full-length natures of these transcripts have not been determined.
