= ATP2B2 =

Protein-coding gene in the species Homo sapiens

Identifiers
- Aliases: ATP2B2, PMCA2, PMCA2a, PMCA2i, ATPase plasma membrane Ca2+ transporting 2, DFNA82
- External IDs: OMIM: 108733; MGI: 105368; GeneCards: ATP2B2
Enzyme activity
EC #	BRENDA	ExPASy	KEGG	MetaCyc
7.2.2.10	↗	↗	↗	↗

Gene location (Human)
Chr.	Chromosome 3 (human)
Band	3p25.3	Start	10,324,023 bp
Band	3p25.3	End	10,708,007 bp

Gene location (Mouse)
Chr.	Chromosome 6 (mouse)
Band	6 E3|6 52.85 cM	Start	113,720,792 bp
Band	6 E3|6 52.85 cM	End	114,019,574 bp
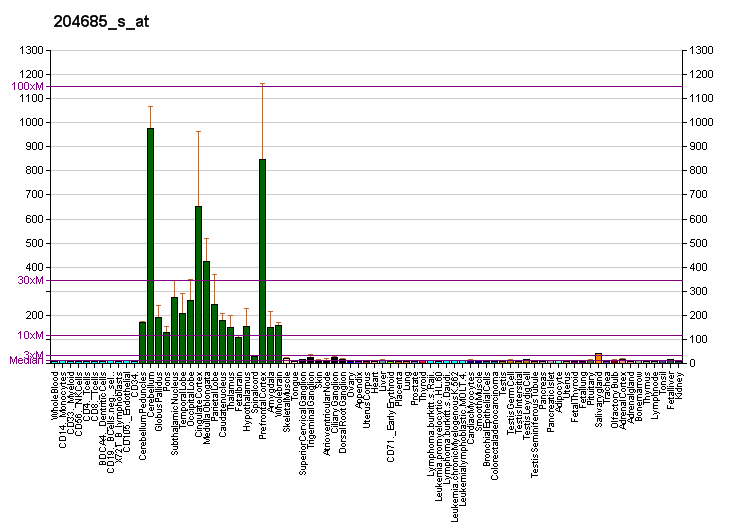

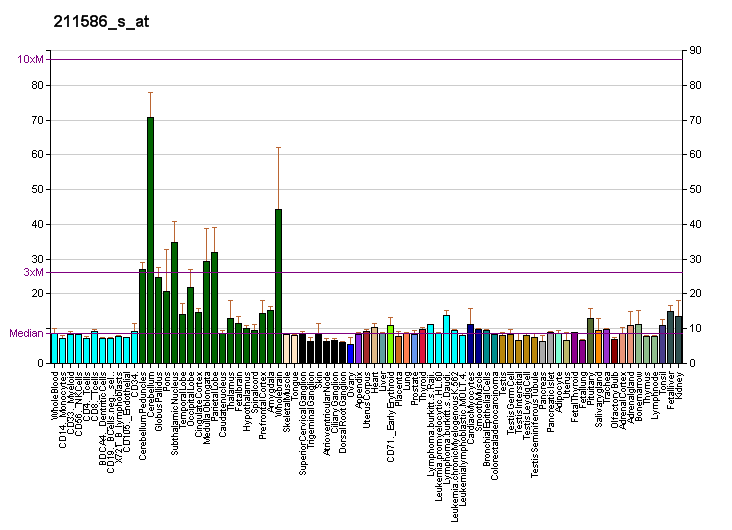

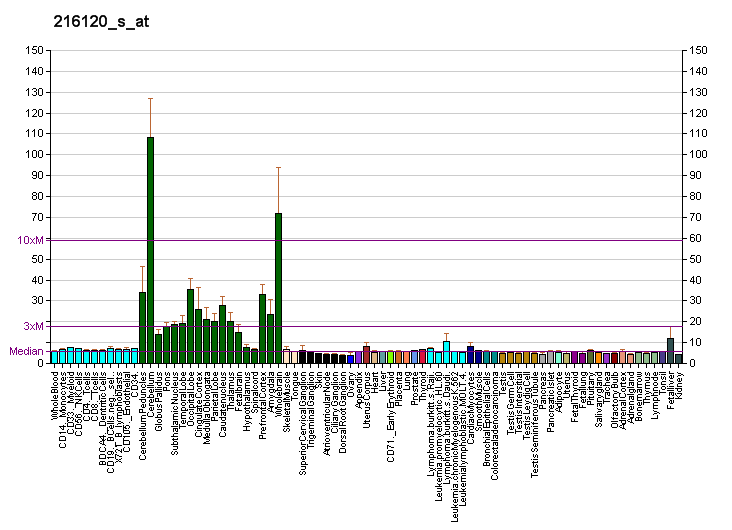
RNA expression pattern
Bgee	Human / Mouse (ortholog); Top expressed in: lateral nuclear group of thalamus; endothelial cell; Brodmann area 46; pons; middle temporal gyrus; external globus pallidus; Brodmann area 23; parietal lobe; occipital lobe; postcentral gyrus / Top expressed in: olfactory tubercle; cerebellar vermis; lobe of cerebellum; lateral septal nucleus; prefrontal cortex; lateral geniculate nucleus; vestibular membrane of cochlear duct; superior frontal gyrus; medial geniculate nucleus; medial dorsal nucleus; More reference expression data
BioGPS	More reference expression data
Gene ontology
Molecular function	nucleotide binding; calcium ion binding; metal ion binding; calmodulin binding; protein C-terminus binding; protein binding; ATP binding; hydrolase activity; P-type calcium transporter activity; PDZ domain binding; P-type calcium transporter activity involved in regulation of presynaptic cytosolic calcium ion concentration; P-type calcium transporter activity involved in regulation of postsynaptic cytosolic calcium ion concentration
Cellular component	cytoplasm; integral component of membrane; intracellular membrane-bounded organelle; membrane; plasma membrane; synapse; integral component of plasma membrane; cell junction; extracellular exosome; presynapse; postsynaptic density membrane; glutamatergic synapse; GABA-ergic synapse
Biological process	regulation of cardiac conduction; ion transport; ion transmembrane transport; neuron differentiation; calcium ion transport; calcium ion transmembrane transport; hearing; regulation of cytosolic calcium ion concentration; transport; cellular calcium ion homeostasis; regulation of presynaptic cytosolic calcium ion concentration; regulation of postsynaptic cytosolic calcium ion concentration
Sources:Amigo / QuickGO
Orthologs
Databases	NCBI: entry; OMA: entry
Species	Human	Mouse
Entrez	491	11941
Ensembl	ENSG00000157087	ENSMUSG00000030302
UniProt	Q01814	Q9R0K7
RefSeq (mRNA)	NM_001001331; NM_001683; NM_001330611; NM_001353564; NM_001363862	NM_001036684; NM_009723; NM_001347365
RefSeq (protein)	NP_001001331; NP_001317540; NP_001674; NP_001340493; NP_001350791	NP_001031761; NP_001334294; NP_033853
Location (UCSC)	Chr 3: 10.32 – 10.71 Mb	Chr 6: 113.72 – 114.02 Mb
PubMed search
- Wikidata
View/Edit Human	View/Edit Mouse

Plasma membrane calcium-transporting ATPase 2 is an enzyme that in humans is encoded by the ATP2B2 gene.

The protein encoded by this gene belongs to the family of P-type primary ion transport ATPases characterized by the formation of an aspartyl phosphate intermediate during the reaction cycle. These enzymes remove bivalent calcium ions from eukaryotic cells against very large concentration gradients and play a critical role in intracellular calcium homeostasis. The mammalian plasma membrane calcium ATPase isoforms are encoded by at least four separate genes and the diversity of these enzymes is further increased by alternative splicing of transcripts. The expression of different isoforms and splice variants is regulated in a developmental, tissue- and cell type-specific manner, suggesting that these pumps are functionally adapted to the physiological needs of particular cells and tissues. This gene encodes the plasma membrane calcium ATPase isoform 2. Alternatively spliced transcript variants encoding different isoforms have been identified.
