= ATP9A =

Protein-coding gene in the species Homo sapiens

Identifiers
- Aliases: ATP9A, ATPIIA, ATPase phospholipid transporting 9A (putative)
- External IDs: OMIM: 609126; MGI: 1330826; GeneCards: ATP9A
Enzyme activity
EC #	BRENDA	ExPASy	KEGG	MetaCyc
7.6.2.1	↗	↗	↗	↗

Gene location (Human)
Chr.	Chromosome 20 (human)
Band	20q13.2	Start	51,596,514 bp
Band	20q13.2	End	51,768,390 bp

Gene location (Mouse)
Chr.	Chromosome 2 (mouse)
Band	2|2 H3	Start	168,476,358 bp
Band	2|2 H3	End	168,584,329 bp
RNA expression pattern
Bgee	Human / Mouse (ortholog); Top expressed in: middle temporal gyrus; Brodmann area 46; Brodmann area 23; orbitofrontal cortex; internal globus pallidus; entorhinal cortex; superior frontal gyrus; postcentral gyrus; paraflocculus of cerebellum; Brodmann area 10 / Top expressed in: perirhinal cortex; entorhinal cortex; CA3 field; primary visual cortex; dentate gyrus of hippocampal formation granule cell; superior frontal gyrus; cerebellar cortex; central gray substance of midbrain; nucleus of stria terminalis; dorsomedial hypothalamic nucleus; More reference expression data
BioGPS	n/a
Gene ontology
Molecular function	ATPase-coupled intramembrane lipid transporter activity; nucleotide binding; ATP binding; magnesium ion binding; hydrolase activity; metal ion binding
Cellular component	perinuclear region of cytoplasm; integral component of membrane; recycling endosome; endosome; trans-Golgi network; plasma membrane; Golgi apparatus; early endosome; early endosome membrane; membrane
Biological process	phospholipid transport; endocytosis; retrograde vesicle-mediated transport, Golgi to endoplasmic reticulum; phospholipid translocation
Sources:Amigo / QuickGO
Orthologs
Databases	NCBI: entry; OMA: entry
Species	Human	Mouse
Entrez	10079	11981
Ensembl	ENSG00000054793	ENSMUSG00000027546
UniProt	O75110	O70228
RefSeq (mRNA)	NM_006045	NM_001289445; NM_001289446; NM_015731; NM_001354977; NM_001354978
RefSeq (protein)	NP_006036	NP_001276374; NP_001276375; NP_056546; NP_001341906; NP_001341907
Location (UCSC)	Chr 20: 51.6 – 51.77 Mb	Chr 2: 168.48 – 168.58 Mb
PubMed search
- Wikidata
View/Edit Human	View/Edit Mouse

Probable phospholipid-transporting ATPase IIA is a protein that in humans is encoded by the ATP9A gene.
