= SPCA (disambiguation) =

Society for the Prevention of Cruelty to Animals (SPCA) is a common name for non-profit animal welfare organizations around the world.

SPCA may also refer to:

- Coagulation factor VII, sometimes called serum prothrombin conversion accelerator
- Secretory Pathway Ca²⁺ ATPase, a protein also known as SPCA
- Société Provençale de Constructions Aéronautiques, a French aircraft manufacturer that merged into SNCASE
- Sparse PCA (Sparse Principal Components Analysis), a specialised technique used in data analysis
