= RPCA =

RPCA may refer to:

- Reformed Presbyterian Church of Australia
- Robust principal component analysis
- Research, Protection, Containment Authority
