= Hailey–Hailey disease =

- Other names: Familial benign chronic pemphigus
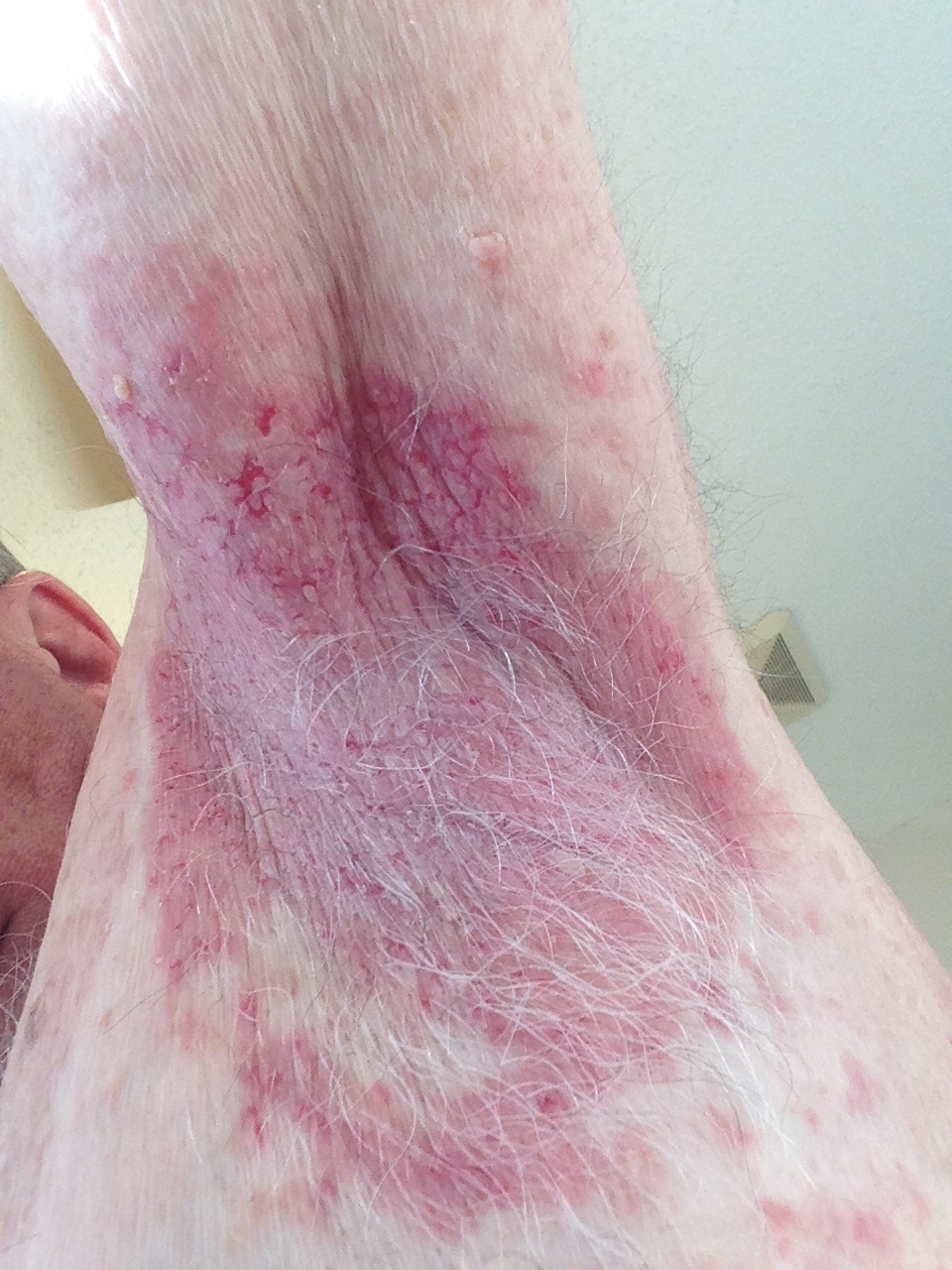
- Left axilla mild, uninfected Hailey–Hailey lesion
- Specialty: Medical genetics
- Symptoms: Rashes and blisters on the skin, could be painful to the touch with a possibility of acantholysis, erythema and hyperkeratosis.
- Usual onset: Late teenage years or 30s-40s
- Duration: Chronic
- Causes: Mutations in the ATP2C1 gene
- Risk factors: Family history
- Named after: Hugh Edward Hailey and William Howard Hailey

Hailey–Hailey disease (HHD), or familial benign chronic pemphigus or familial benign pemphigus, was originally described by the Hailey brothers (Hugh Edward and William Howard) in 1939. It is a genetic disorder that causes blisters to form on the skin.

== Signs and symptoms ==
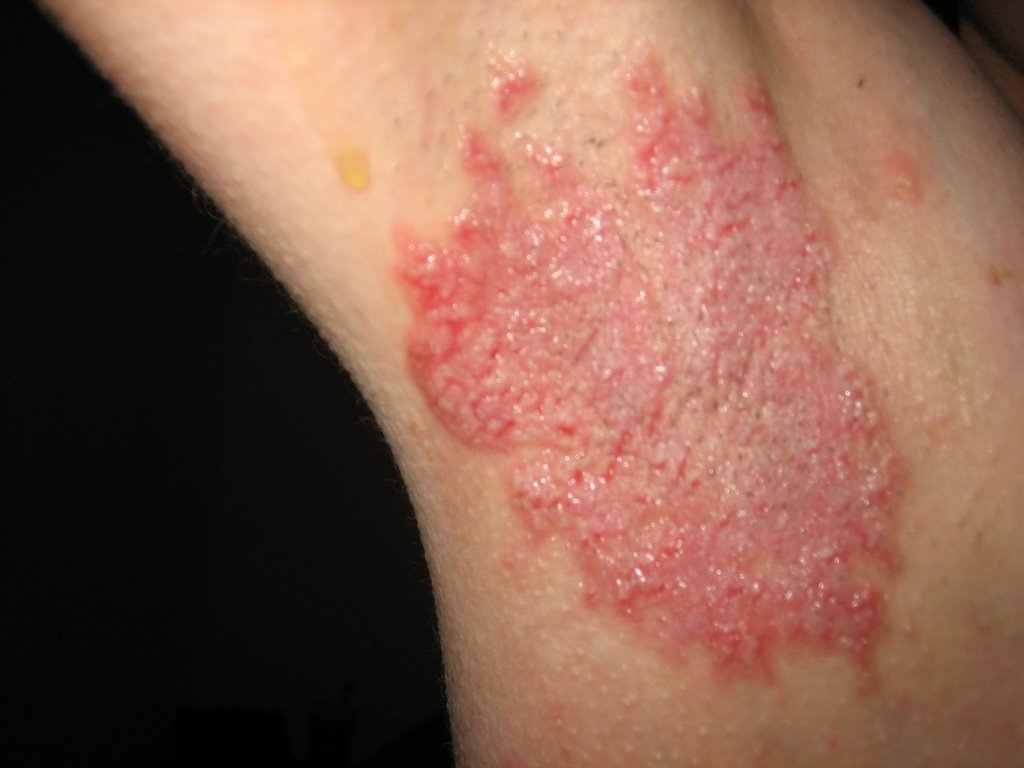
Right armpit skin affected during Hailey–Hailey disease flare

HHD is characterized by outbreaks of rashes and blisters on the skin. Affected areas of skin undergo repeated blistering and inflammation, and may be painful to the touch. Areas where the skin folds, as well as the armpits, groin, neck, buttocks and under the breasts are most commonly affected. In addition to blistering, other symptoms which accompany HHD include acantholysis, erythema and hyperkeratosis. It typically begins in late teenage years or in a person's 30s or 40s.

== Causes ==
The cause of the disease is a haploinsufficiency of the enzyme ATP2C1; the ATP2C1 gene is located on chromosome 3, which encodes the protein hSPCA1. A mutation on one copy of the gene causes only half of this necessary protein to be made and the cells of the skin do not adhere together properly due to malformation of intercellular desmosomes, causing acantholysis, blisters and rashes. There is no known cure.

== Diagnosis ==
=== Classification ===
While the term pemphigus typically refers to "a rare group of blistering autoimmune diseases" affecting "the skin and mucous membranes", Hailey–Hailey disease is not an autoimmune disorder and there are no autoantibodies. According to Pemphigus Pemphigoid Foundation (IPPF), "familial benign chronic pemphigus, or Hailey–Hailey disease, is a different condition from Pemphigus".

=== Differential diagnosis ===
The differential diagnosis includes intertrigo, candidiasis, frictional or contact dermatitis, and inverse psoriasis. A biopsy and/or family history can confirm. The lack of oral lesions and intercellular antibodies distinguishes familial benign pemphigus from other forms of pemphigus.

== Treatment ==
Topical steroid preparations often help outbreaks; use of the weakest corticosteroid that is effective is recommended to help prevent thinning of the skin. Drugs such as antibiotics, antifungals, corticosteroids, dapsone, methotrexate, thalidomide, etretinate, cyclosporine and, most recently, intramuscular alefacept may control the disease but are ineffective for severe chronic or relapsing forms of the disease. Intracutaneous injections of botulinum toxin to inhibit perspiration may be of benefit. Maintaining a healthy weight, avoiding heat and friction of affected areas, and keeping the area clean and dry may help prevent flares.

Some have found relief in laser resurfacing that burns off the top layer of the epidermis, allowing healthy non-affected skin to regrow in its place. Secondary bacterial, fungal and/or viral infections are common and may exacerbate an outbreak. Some have found that outbreaks are triggered by certain foods, hormone cycles and stress.

In many cases naltrexone, taken daily in low doses, appears to help.

== See also ==
- List of cutaneous conditions
