= ATP2C1 =

Protein-coding gene in the species Homo sapiens

Identifiers
- Aliases: ATP2C1, ATP2C1A, BCPM, HHD, PMR1, SPCA1, hSPCA1, ATPase secretory pathway Ca2+ transporting 1
- External IDs: OMIM: 604384; MGI: 1889008; GeneCards: ATP2C1
Enzyme activity
| EC # | BRENDA | ExPASy | KEGG | MetaCyc |
|---|---|---|---|---|
| 7.2.2.10 | ↗ | ↗ | ↗ | ↗ |

Gene location (Human)
| Chr. | Chromosome 3 (human) |
| Band | 3q22.1 | Start | 130,850,595 bp |
| Band | 3q22.1 | End | 131,016,712 bp |

Gene location (Mouse)
| Chr. | Chromosome 9 (mouse) |
| Band | 9|9 F1 | Start | 105,280,738 bp |
| Band | 9|9 F1 | End | 105,404,518 bp |
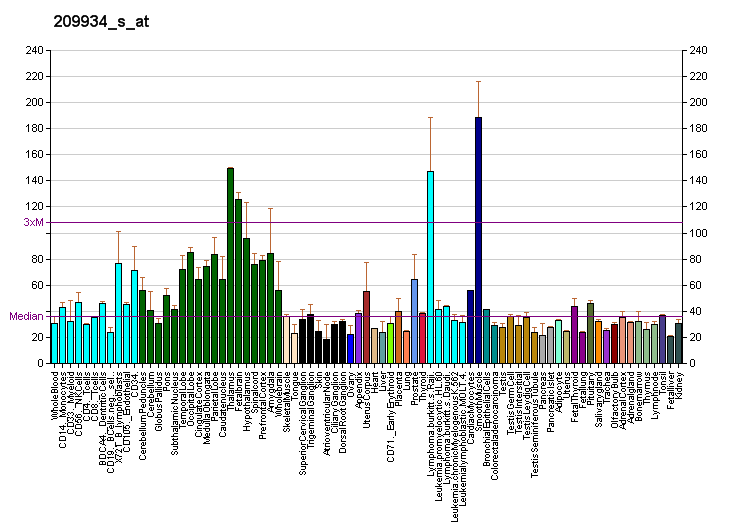

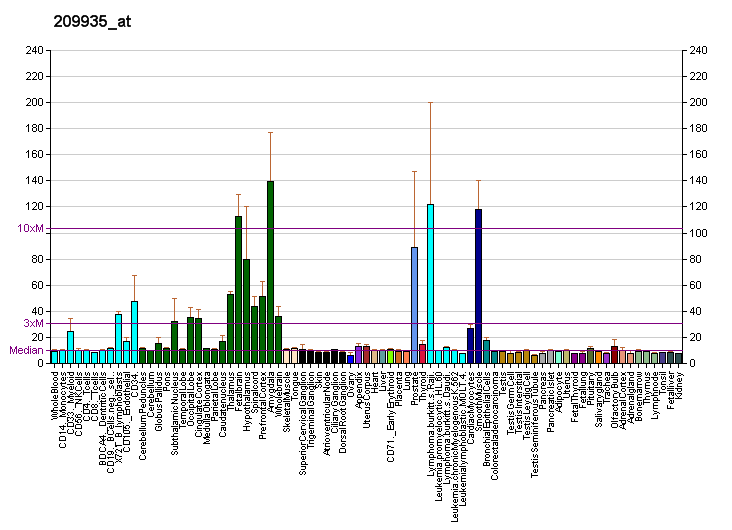
RNA expression pattern
| Bgee | Human / Mouse (ortholog); Top expressed in: secondary oocyte; ventricular zone; stromal cell of endometrium; endothelial cell; epithelium of colon; islet of Langerhans; C1 segment; ganglionic eminence; Epithelium of choroid plexus; Achilles tendon / Top expressed in: secondary oocyte; zygote; granulocyte; neural layer of retina; seminal vesicula; dentate gyrus of hippocampal formation granule cell; primary oocyte; tail of embryo; otic placode; primary visual cortex; More reference expression data |
| BioGPS | More reference expression data |
Gene ontology
| Molecular function | nucleotide binding; calcium ion binding; manganese ion binding; P-type calcium transporter activity; signal transducer activity; metal ion binding; ABC-type manganese transporter activity; hydrolase activity; ATP binding |
| Cellular component | integral component of membrane; Golgi apparatus; membrane; Golgi membrane; trans-Golgi network |
| Biological process | calcium-dependent cell-cell adhesion via plasma membrane cell adhesion molecules; actin cytoskeleton reorganization; cellular calcium ion homeostasis; Golgi calcium ion homeostasis; ion transport; ion transmembrane transport; epidermis development; positive regulation of I-kappaB kinase/NF-kappaB signaling; cellular manganese ion homeostasis; manganese ion transport; Golgi calcium ion transport; calcium ion transport; manganese ion transmembrane transport; signal transduction; calcium ion transmembrane transport; transport |
Sources:Amigo / QuickGO
Orthologs
| Databases | NCBI: entry; OMA: entry |
| Species | Human | Mouse |
| Entrez | 27032 | 235574 |
| Ensembl | ENSG00000017260 | ENSMUSG00000032570 |
| UniProt | P98194 | Q80XR2 |
| RefSeq (mRNA) | NM_001001485; NM_001001486; NM_001001487; NM_001199179; NM_001199180 NM_001199181; NM_001199182; NM_001199183; NM_001199184; NM_001199185; NM_014382; NM_001378511; NM_001378512; NM_001378513; NM_001378514; NM_001378687 | NM_001253831; NM_001253834; NM_001253836; NM_175025; NM_001359822 NM_001359823 |
| RefSeq (protein) | NP_001001485; NP_001001486; NP_001001487; NP_001186108; NP_001186109 NP_001186110; NP_001186111; NP_001186112; NP_001186113; NP_001186114; NP_055197; NP_001365440; NP_001365441; NP_001365442; NP_001365443; NP_001365616 | NP_001240760; NP_001240763; NP_001240765; NP_778190; NP_001346751 NP_001346752 |
| Location (UCSC) | Chr 3: 130.85 – 131.02 Mb | Chr 9: 105.28 – 105.4 Mb |
| PubMed search |
- Wikidata
| View/Edit Human | View/Edit Mouse |

Calcium-transporting ATPase type 2C member 1 is an enzyme that in humans is encoded by the ATP2C1 gene.

This gene encodes one of the SPCA proteins, a Ca^{2+} ion-transporting P-type ATPase. This magnesium-dependent enzyme catalyzes the hydrolysis of ATP coupled with the transport of the calcium. Defects in this gene cause Hailey-Hailey disease, an autosomal dominant disorder. Alternatively spliced transcript variants encoding different isoforms have been identified.
