= Robust principal component analysis =

Method of data analysis

Robust Principal Component Analysis (RPCA) is a modification of the widely used statistical procedure of principal component analysis (PCA) which works well with respect to grossly corrupted observations. A number of different approaches exist for Robust PCA, including an idealized version of Robust PCA, which aims to recover a low-rank matrix L_{0} from highly corrupted measurements M = L_{0} +S_{0}. This decomposition in low-rank and sparse matrices can be achieved by techniques such as Principal Component Pursuit method (PCP), Stable PCP, Quantized PCP, Block based PCP, and Local PCP. Then, optimization methods are used such as the Augmented Lagrange Multiplier Method (ALM), Alternating Direction Method (ADM), Fast Alternating Minimization (FAM), Iteratively Reweighted Least Squares (IRLS) or alternating projections (AP).

== Algorithms ==
=== Non-convex method ===
The 2014 guaranteed algorithm for the robust PCA problem (with the input matrix being $M=L+S$) is an alternating minimization type algorithm. The computational complexity is $O\left(m n r^2 \log\frac{1}{\epsilon} \right)$ where the input is the superposition of a low-rank (of rank $r$) and a sparse matrix of dimension $m \times n$ and $\epsilon$ is the desired accuracy of the recovered solution, i.e., $\| \widehat{L}-L \|_F \leq \epsilon$ where $L$ is the true low-rank component and $\widehat{L}$ is the estimated or recovered low-rank component. Intuitively, this algorithm performs projections of the residual onto the set of low-rank matrices (via the SVD operation) and sparse matrices (via entry-wise hard thresholding) in an alternating manner - that is, low-rank projection of the difference the input matrix and the sparse matrix obtained at a given iteration followed by sparse projection of the difference of the input matrix and the low-rank matrix obtained in the previous step, and iterating the two steps until convergence.

This alternating projections algorithm is later improved by an accelerated version, coined AccAltProj. The acceleration is achieved by applying a tangent space projection before projecting the residue onto the set of low-rank matrices. This trick improves the computational complexity to $O\left(m n r \log\frac{1}{\epsilon} \right)$ with a much smaller constant in front while it maintains the theoretically guaranteed linear convergence.

Another fast version of accelerated alternating projections algorithm is IRCUR. It uses the structure of CUR decomposition in alternating projections framework to dramatically reduces the computational complexity of RPCA to $O\left(\max\{m,n\} r^2 \log(m) \log(n) \log\frac{1}{\epsilon} \right)$

=== Convex relaxation ===
This method consists of relaxing the rank constraint $rank(L)$ in the optimization problem to the nuclear norm $\|L\|_*$ and the sparsity constraint $\|S\|_0$ to $\ell_1$-norm $\|S\|_1$. The resulting program can be solved using methods such as the method of Augmented Lagrange Multipliers.

=== Deep-learning augmented method ===
Some recent works propose RPCA algorithms with learnable/training parameters. Such a learnable/trainable algorithm can be unfolded as a deep neural network whose parameters can be learned via machine learning techniques from a given dataset or problem distribution. The learned algorithm will have superior performance on the corresponding problem distribution.

== Applications ==
RPCA has many real life important applications particularly when the data under study can naturally be modeled as a low-rank plus a sparse contribution. Following examples are inspired by contemporary challenges in computer science, and depending on the applications, either the low-rank component or the sparse component could be the object of interest:

=== Video surveillance ===
Given a sequence of surveillance video frames, it is often required to identify the activities that stand out from the background. If we stack the video frames as columns of a matrix M, then the low-rank component L_{0} naturally corresponds to the stationary background and the sparse component S_{0} captures the moving objects in the foreground.

=== Face recognition ===
Images of a convex, Lambertian surface under varying illuminations span a low-dimensional subspace. This is one of the reasons for effectiveness of low-dimensional models for imagery data. In particular, it is easy to approximate images of a human's face by a low-dimensional subspace. To be able to correctly retrieve this subspace is crucial in many applications such as face recognition and alignment. It turns out that RPCA can be applied successfully to this problem to exactly recover the face.

== See also ==
- L1-norm principal component analysis

== Surveys ==
- Robust PCA
- Dynamic RPCA
- Decomposition into Low-rank plus Additive Matrices
- Low-rank models

== Books, journals and workshops ==
=== Books ===
- T. Bouwmans, N. Aybat, and E. Zahzah. Handbook on Robust Low-Rank and Sparse Matrix Decomposition: Applications in Image and Video Processing, CRC Press, Taylor and Francis Group, May 2016. (more information: http://www.crcpress.com/product/isbn/9781498724623)
- Z. Lin, H. Zhang, "Low-Rank Models in Visual Analysis: Theories, Algorithms, and Applications", Academic Press, Elsevier, June 2017. (more information: https://www.elsevier.com/books/low-rank-models-in-visual-analysis/lin/978-0-12-812731-5)

=== Journals ===
- N. Vaswani, Y. Chi, T. Bouwmans, Special Issue on “Rethinking PCA for Modern Datasets: Theory, Algorithms, and Applications”, Proceedings of the IEEE, 2018.
- T. Bouwmans, N. Vaswani, P. Rodriguez, R. Vidal, Z. Lin, Special Issue on “Robust Subspace Learning and Tracking: Theory, Algorithms, and Applications”, IEEE Journal of Selected Topics in Signal Processing, December 2018.

=== Workshops ===
- RSL-CV 2015: Workshop on Robust Subspace Learning and Computer Vision in conjunction with ICCV 2015 (For more information: http://rsl-cv2015.univ-lr.fr/workshop/)
- RSL-CV 2017: Workshop on Robust Subspace Learning and Computer Vision in conjunction with ICCV 2017 (For more information: http://rsl-cv.univ-lr.fr/2017/)
- RSL-CV 2021: Workshop on Robust Subspace Learning and Computer Vision in conjunction with ICCV 2021 (For more information: https://rsl-cv.univ-lr.fr/2021/)

=== Sessions ===
- Special Session on "Online Algorithms for Static and Dynamic Robust PCA and Compressive Sensing" in conjunction with SSP 2018. (More information: https://ssp2018.org/)

== Resources and libraries ==
=== Websites ===
- Background Subtraction Website
- DLAM Website
- Documentation from the University of Illinois - Archive Link

=== Libraries ===
The LRS Library (developed by Andrews Sobral) provides a collection of low-rank and sparse decomposition algorithms in MATLAB. The library was designed for moving object detection in videos, but it can be also used for other computer vision / machine learning tasks. Currently the LRSLibrary offers more than 100 algorithms based on matrix and tensor methods.
