= Namrata Vaswani =

Indian-American electrical engineer

Namrata Vaswani is an Indian-American electrical engineer known for her research in compressed sensing, robust principal component analysis, signal processing, statistical learning theory, and computer vision. She is a Joseph and Elizabeth Anderlik Professor in Electrical and Computer Engineering at Iowa State University, and (by courtesy) a professor of mathematics at Iowa State.

== Education and career ==
Namrata Vaswani earned a bachelor's degree in electrical engineering at the Indian Institute of Technology Delhi in 1999. She completed a Ph.D. in electrical and computer engineering in 2004 at the University of Maryland, College Park. Her doctoral advisor was Rama Chellappa, and her dissertation was Change detection in stochastic shape dynamical models with applications in activity modeling and abnormality detection.

After postdoctoral research at the Georgia Institute of Technology, she joined the Iowa State faculty in 2005. She was given her courtesy appointment in mathematics in 2013, and the Anderlik Professorship in 2019. She also chairs the Women in Signal Processing Committee of the IEEE Signal Processing Society.

== Recognition ==
In 2018, Namrata Vaswani was named a Fellow of the IEEE "for contributions to dynamic structured high-dimensional data recovery".. In 2019 she was named a distinguished alumni of the University of Maryland Electrical and Computer Engineering Department.
