= Secretory Pathway Ca²⁺ ATPase =

Transport protein

SPCA, or Secretory Pathway Ca^{2+}-ATPase, is a calcium ATPase-type P-ATPase encoded for by the genes ATP2C1 and ATP2C2.

== Function ==
SPCA is found primarily in the membranes of the golgi apparatus in increasing concentrations from the cis- to the trans-golgi compartments. Following a calcium spike, SPCA proteins are responsible for transporting Ca^{2+} ions from the cytosol to the lumen of the golgi, thus lowering the cytoplasmic concentrations of Ca^{2+} to resting levels.

SPCA is also able to transport Mn^{2+} ions into the golgi with high affinity, an ability that the related Ca^{2+}-ATPase, SERCA, does not possess. Since Mn^{2+} ions are not used for signalling like Ca^{2+} ions are, the main reason for transporting them out of the cytosol is to prevent manganese toxicity.

The removal of these ions from the cytosol can also be looked upon as supplying the golgi apparatus and thus the entire secretory pathway with these ions. Several proteins within the pathway require either Ca^{2+} ions, Mn^{2+} ions, or divalent ions to function as metal cofactors, such as aminopeptidase P, Proprotein convertases and sulfotransferases.
