= XPNPEP1 =

Protein-coding gene in the species Homo sapiens

Identifiers
- Aliases: XPNPEP1, APP1, SAMP, XPNPEP, XPNPEPL, XPNPEPL1, X-prolyl aminopeptidase (aminopeptidase P) 1, soluble, X-prolyl aminopeptidase 1
- External IDs: OMIM: 602443; MGI: 2180003; GeneCards: XPNPEP1
Available structures
PDB	Ortholog search: PDBe RCSB
PDB	List of PDB id codes 3CTZ
Enzyme activity
EC #	BRENDA	ExPASy	KEGG	MetaCyc
3.4.11.9	↗	↗	↗	↗

Gene location (Human)
Chr.	Chromosome 10 (human)
Band	10q25.1	Start	109,864,766 bp
Band	10q25.1	End	109,923,553 bp

Gene location (Mouse)
Chr.	Chromosome 19 (mouse)
Band	19|19 D2	Start	52,920,357 bp
Band	19|19 D2	End	53,028,645 bp
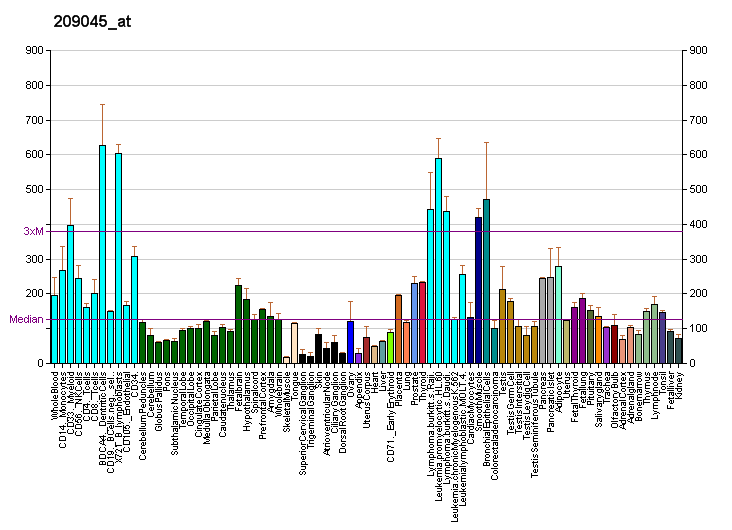

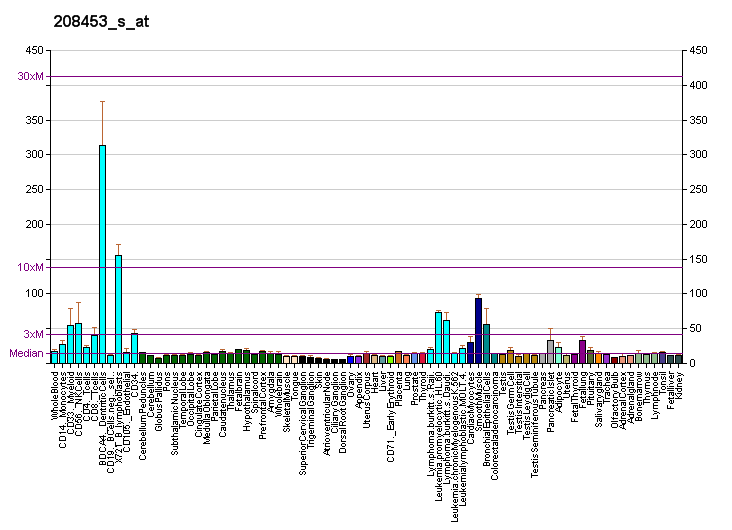
RNA expression pattern
Bgee	Human / Mouse (ortholog); Top expressed in: body of pancreas; jejunal mucosa; epithelium of nasopharynx; stromal cell of endometrium; duodenum; skin of leg; monocyte; rectum; skin of abdomen; tibia / Top expressed in: gastrula; jejunum; ileum; internal carotid artery; yolk sac; external carotid artery; right kidney; stria vascularis; spermatid; duodenum; More reference expression data
BioGPS	More reference expression data
Gene ontology
Molecular function	peptidase activity; aminopeptidase activity; hydrolase activity; metallopeptidase activity; protein homodimerization activity; manganese ion binding; metal ion binding; metalloaminopeptidase activity
Cellular component	extracellular exosome; cytoplasm; cytosol
Biological process	bradykinin catabolic process; proteolysis
Sources:Amigo / QuickGO
Orthologs
Databases	NCBI: entry; OMA: entry
Species	Human	Mouse
Entrez	7511	170750
Ensembl	ENSG00000108039	ENSMUSG00000025027
UniProt	Q9NQW7	Q6P1B1
RefSeq (mRNA)	NM_001167604; NM_020383; NM_001324128; NM_001324131; NM_001324132 NM_001324133; NM_001324134; NM_001324135; NM_001324136	NM_133216; NM_001374834
RefSeq (protein)	NP_001161076; NP_001311057; NP_001311060; NP_001311061; NP_001311062 NP_001311063; NP_001311064; NP_001311065; NP_065116	NP_573479
Location (UCSC)	Chr 10: 109.86 – 109.92 Mb	Chr 19: 52.92 – 53.03 Mb
PubMed search
- Wikidata
View/Edit Human	View/Edit Mouse

Xaa-Pro aminopeptidase 1 is an enzyme that in humans is encoded by the XPNPEP1 gene.

== Function ==
X-prolyl aminopeptidase (EC 3.4.11.9) is a proline-specific metalloaminopeptidase that specifically catalyzes the removal of any unsubstituted N-terminal amino acid that is adjacent to a penultimate proline residue. Because of its specificity toward proline, it has been suggested that X-prolyl aminopeptidase is important in the maturation and degradation of peptide hormones, neuropeptides, and tachykinins, as well as in the digestion of otherwise resistant dietary protein fragments, thereby complementing the pancreatic peptidases. Deficiency of X-prolyl aminopeptidase results in excretion of large amounts of imino-oligopeptides in urine (Blau et al., 1988).[supplied by OMIM]
