= Two-factor theory of intelligence =

General and special components

Charles Spearman developed his two-factor theory of intelligence using factor analysis. His research not only led him to develop the concept of the g factor of general intelligence, but also the s factor of specific intellectual abilities. L. L. Thurstone, Howard Gardner, and Robert Sternberg also researched the structure of intelligence, and in analyzing their data, concluded that a single underlying factor was influencing the general intelligence of individuals. However, Spearman was criticized in 1916 by Godfrey Thomson, who claimed that the evidence was not as crucial as it seemed. Modern research is still expanding this theory by investigating Spearman's law of diminishing returns, and adding connected concepts to the research.

== Spearman's two-factor theory of intelligence ==
In 1904, Charles Spearman had developed a statistical procedure called factor analysis. In factor analysis, related variables are tested for correlation to each other, then the correlation of the related items are evaluated to find clusters or groups of the variables. Spearman tested how well people performed on various tasks relating to intelligence. Such tasks include: distinguishing pitch, perceiving weight and colors, directions, and mathematics. When analyzing the data he collected, Spearman noted that those that did well in one area also scored higher in other areas. With this data, Spearman concluded that there must be one central factor that influences our cognitive abilities. Spearman termed this general intelligence g.

== Structure of intelligence debate ==
Due to the controversy of the structure of intelligence, other psychologists also published their relevant research. Other than Charles Spearman, three others developed a hypothesis regarding the structure of intelligence. L. L. Thurstone tested subjects on 56 different abilities; from his data he established seven primary mental abilities relating to intelligence. He categorized them as: spatial ability, numerical ability, word fluency, memory, perceptual speed, verbal comprehension, and inductive reasoning. Other researchers, interested in this new research study, analyzed Thurstone's data, discovering that those scored high in one category often did well in the others. This finding gives support that there is an underlying factor influencing them, namely g.

Howard Gardner suggested in his theory of multiple intelligences that intelligence is formed out of multiple abilities. He recognized eight intelligences: linguistic, musical, spatial, intrapersonal, interpersonal, logical-mathematical, bodily-kinesthetic, and naturalist. He also considered the possibility of a ninth intelligent ability, existential intelligence. Gardner proposed that individuals who excelled in one ability would lack in another. Instead, his results showed that each of his eight intelligences correlate positively with each other. After further analysis, Gardner found that logic, spatial abilities, language, and mathematics are all linked in some way, giving support for an underlying g factor that is prominent in almost all intelligence in general.

Robert Sternberg agreed with Gardner that there were multiple intelligences, but he narrowed his scope to just three in his triarchic theory of intelligence: analytical, creative, and practical. He classified analytical intelligence as problem-solving skills in tests and academics. Creative intelligence is considered how people react adaptively in new situations, or create novel ideas. Practical intelligence is defined as the everyday logic used when multiple solutions or decisions are possible. When Sternberg analyzed his data the relationship between the three intelligences surprised him. The data resembled what the other psychologists had found. All three mental abilities correlated highly with one another, and evidence that one basic factor, g, was the primary influence.

Not all psychologists agreed with Spearman and his general intelligence. In 1916, Godfrey Thomson wrote a paper criticizing Spearman's g:

The object of this paper is to show that the cases brought forward by Professor Spearman in favor of the existence of General Ability are by no means "crucial." They are it is true not inconsistent with the existence of such a common element but neither are they inconsistent with its non-existence. The essential point about Professor Spearman's hypothesis is the existence of this General Factor. Both he and his opponents are agreed that there are Specific Factors peculiar to individual tests, both he and his opponents agree that there are Group Factors which run through some but not all tests. The difference between them is that Professor Spearman says there is a further single factor which runs through all tests, and that by pooling a few tests the Group Factors can soon be eliminated and a point reached where all the correlations are due to the General Factor alone. (pp. 217)

== Development of Spearman's theory ==
=== Experimental Evidence ===
Spearman originally came up with the term General Intelligence, or as he called it, g, to measure intelligence in his Two Theory on Intelligence. Spearman first researched in an experiment with 24 children from a small village school measuring three intellectual measures, based on teacher's rankings, to address intellectual and sensory as the two different sets of measure: School Cleverness, Common Sense A and Common Sense B. His results showed the average r between intellectual and sensory measures to be +.38, School Cleverness and Commonsense to be at +0.55, and the three tasks intercorrelated at +0.25. This data was looked at other populations including high school. Spearman proposed that intellectual and sensory measure be combined as assessment of general intelligence.

=== g and s ===
Spearman's two-factor theory proposes that intelligence has two components: general intelligence ("g") and specific ability ("s"). To explain the differences in performance on different tasks, Spearman hypothesized that the "s" component was specific to a certain aspect of intelligence. Regarding g, Spearman saw individuals as having some level of more or less general intelligence, while s varied from person to person based on the specific task. In 1999, behavior geneticist Robert Plomin described g by saying: "g is one of the most reliable and valid measures in the behavioral domain... and it predicts important social outcomes such as educational and occupational levels far better than any other trait."

To visualize g, imagine a Venn diagram with four circles overlapping. In the middle of the overlapping circles, would be g, which influences all the specific intelligences, while s is represented by the four circles. Though the specific number of s factors are unknown, a few have been relatively accepted: mechanical, spatial, logical, and arithmetical.

Rising interest in the debate on the structure of intelligence prompted Spearman to elaborate and argue for his hypothesis. He claimed that g was not made up of one single ability, but rather two genetically influenced, unique abilities working together. He called these abilities "eductive" and "reproductive". He suggested that future understanding of the interaction between these two different abilities would drastically change how individual differences and cognition are understood in psychology, possibly creating the basis for wisdom.

== Impact on psychology ==
=== Intelligence testing ===
Many researches are currently using Spearman's form of intelligence testing in their current studies. Although not all of the studies are currently using Spearman's exact model for intelligence testing, they are adding some modern concepts to that study. Spearman described that there was a functional relationship between intelligence and Sensory Discriminatory Abilities. Recent research has determined that there is an overlap between Working Memory, General Discriminatory Abilities, and Fluid Intelligence. His work has been built on, expanded, and linked to many other factors related to intelligence.

Intelligence testing measuring the g factor has been studied recently to re-explore Spearman's law of diminishing returns. This study investigates how g test scores will most likely decrease as g increases. Research has been done to investigate if g scores are made up of scores from Differential Ability Scales, s factors, and how the law of diminishing returns compare to Spearman's Law of diminishing returns. With the use of linear and nonlinear Confirmatory Factor Analysis, it is showing that the nonlinear model best described the data. The nonlinear model suggests that as g increases, the s factor lowers the overall score and inaccurately represents general intelligence.

=== Modern psychology ===
This theory is still greatly present in today's modern psychology. Researchers are examining this theory and recreating it in modern research. The g factor is still frequently studied in current research. For example, a study could use and be compared with various other similar intelligence measures. Scales such as the Wechsler Intelligence Scale for Children has been compared with Spearman's g, which shows that there has a decrease in statistic significance.

Research has been adapted to incorporate modern psychological topics into Spearman's Two Factor Theory of Intelligence. Nature versus Nurture is one topic that has been cross studied with Spearman's g factor. Research shows that although environmental factors influence the g factor differently, it has been found that it is affected if influenced early in life, rather than adulthood where there is little to no impact. Genetic influence has been documented to greatly influence g factor on intelligence.
