= V-ATPase =

Family of transport protein complexes

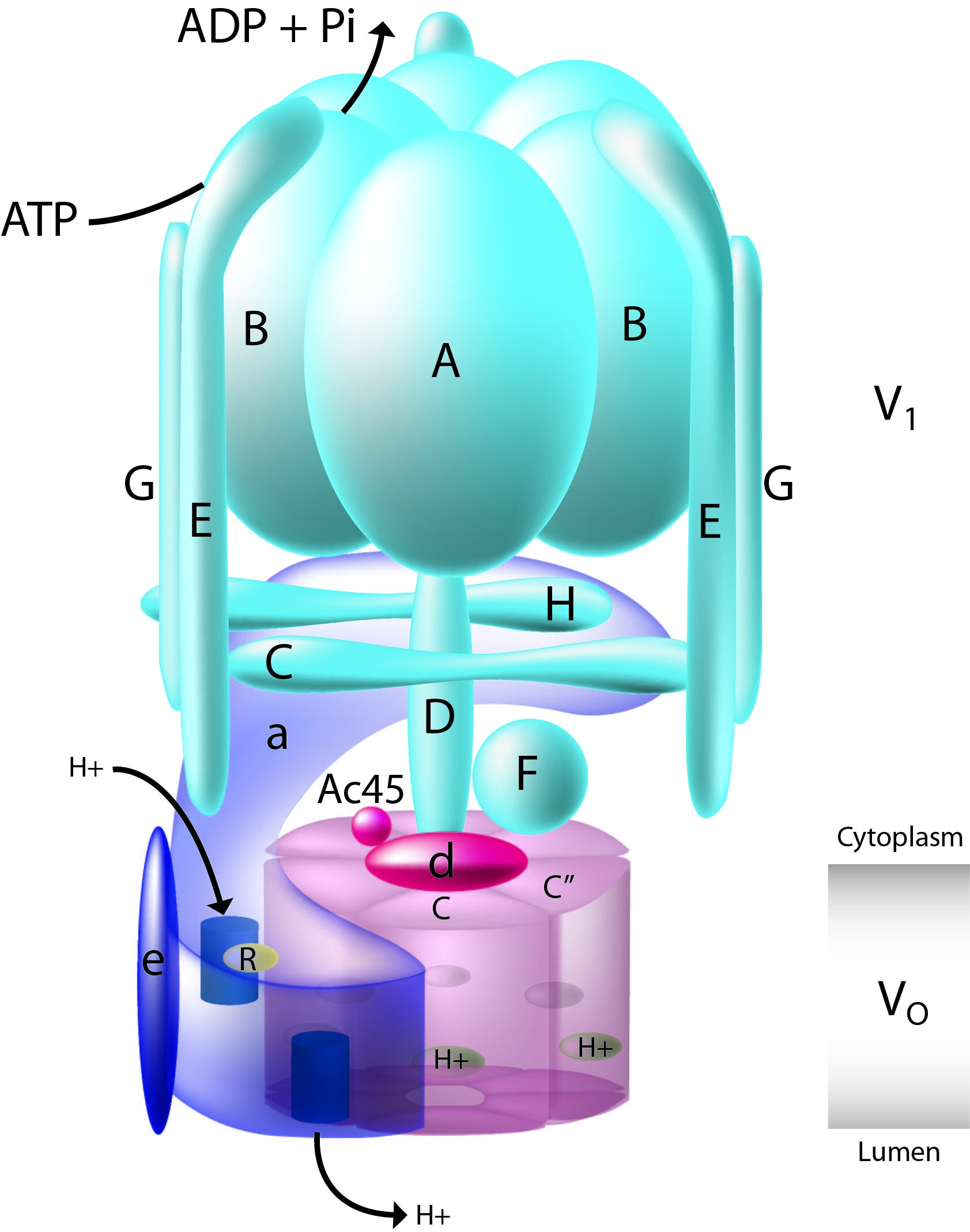
- V-ATPase schematic

Identifiers
- Symbol: V-ATPase
- TCDB: 3.A.2
- OPM superfamily: 5
- OPM protein: 2bl2
- Membranome: 226

V-ATPase, subunit c (Vo)
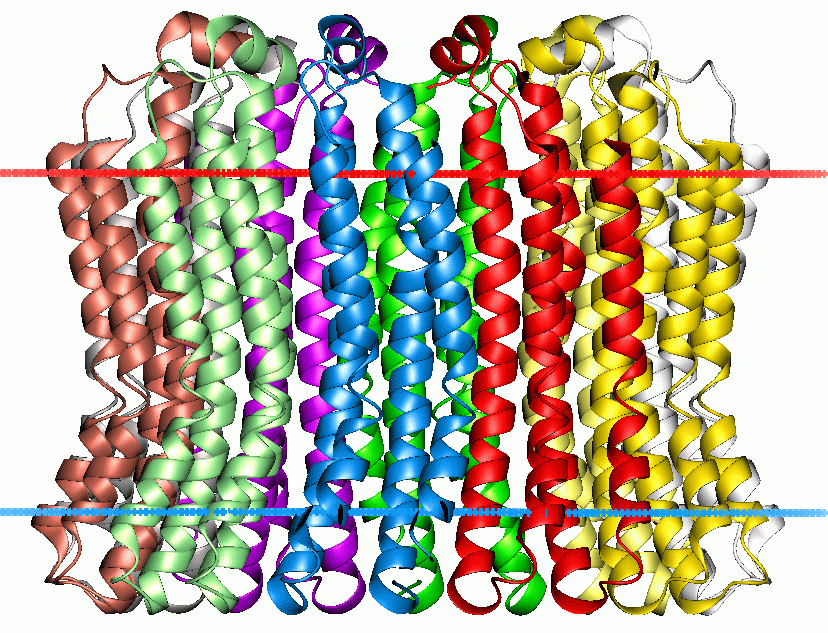
- Membrane-spanning region of the V-type sodium ATPase from Enterococcus hirae. Calculated hydrocarbon boundaries of the lipid bilayer are shown by red and blue dots

Identifiers
- Symbol: ATP-synt_C
- Pfam: PF00137
- InterPro: IPR002379
- PROSITE: PDOC00526
- SCOP2: 1aty / SCOPe / SUPFAM
Available protein structures:
- PDB: IPR002379 PF00137 (ECOD; PDBsum)
- AlphaFold: IPR002379; PF00137

V-ATPase, subunit C (V1)
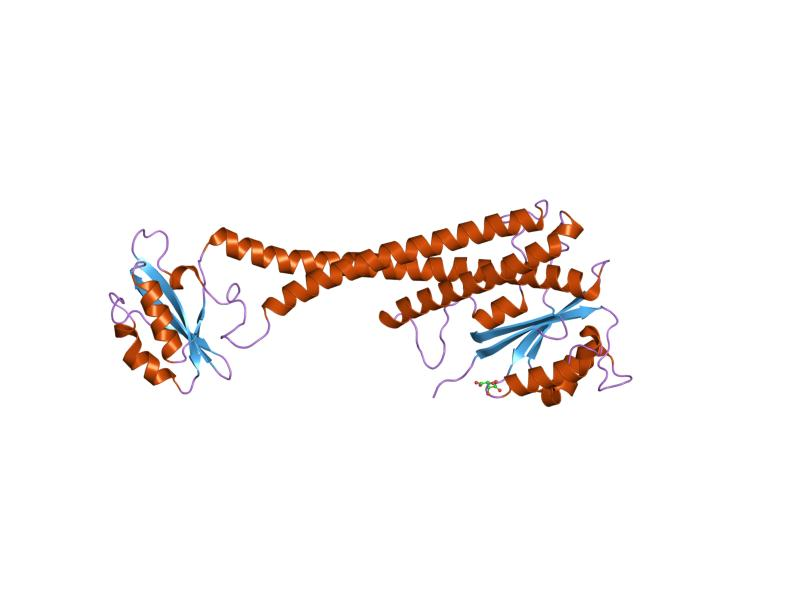
- crystal structure of subunit C (vma5p) of the yeast v-atpase

Identifiers
- Symbol: V-ATPase_C
- Pfam: PF03223
- InterPro: IPR004907
- SCOP2: 1u7l / SCOPe / SUPFAM
Available protein structures:
- PDB: IPR004907 PF03223 (ECOD; PDBsum)
- AlphaFold: IPR004907; PF03223

V-ATPase, subunit I/a

Identifiers
- Symbol: V_ATPase_I
- Pfam: PF01496
- InterPro: IPR002490
- SCOP2: 3rrk / SCOPe / SUPFAM
- TCDB: 3.A.2
Available protein structures:
- PDB: IPR002490 PF01496 (ECOD; PDBsum)
- AlphaFold: IPR002490; PF01496

V-ATPase, subunit E

Identifiers
- Symbol: vATP-synt_E
- Pfam: PF01991
- Pfam clan: CL0255
- InterPro: IPR002842
Available protein structures:
- PDB: IPR002842 PF01991 (ECOD; PDBsum)
- AlphaFold: IPR002842; PF01991

V-ATPase, subunit d/d2
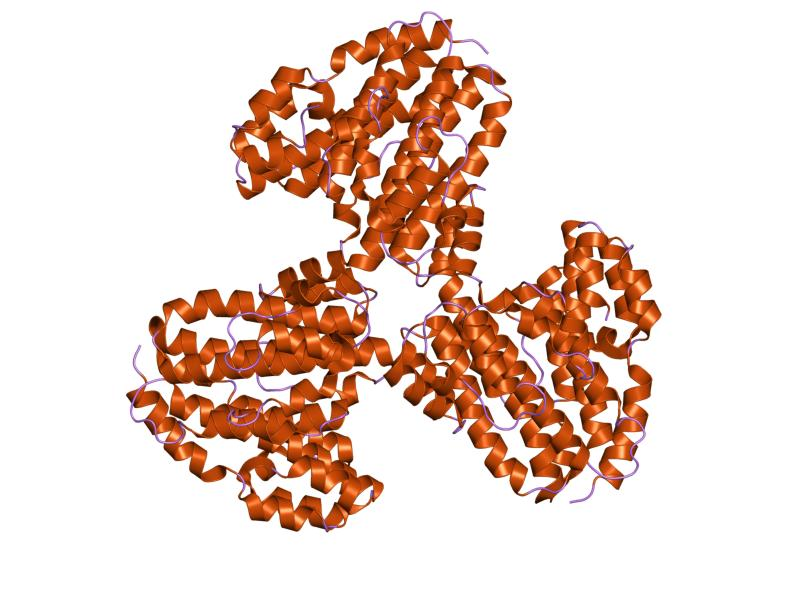
- crystal structure of subunit C (yeast subunit d) of v-atpase

Identifiers
- Symbol: vATP-synt_AC39
- Pfam: PF01992
- InterPro: IPR002843
- SCOP2: 1r5z / SCOPe / SUPFAM
Available protein structures:
- PDB: IPR002843 PF01992 (ECOD; PDBsum)
- AlphaFold: IPR002843; PF01992

V-ATPase, subunit H, N-terminal
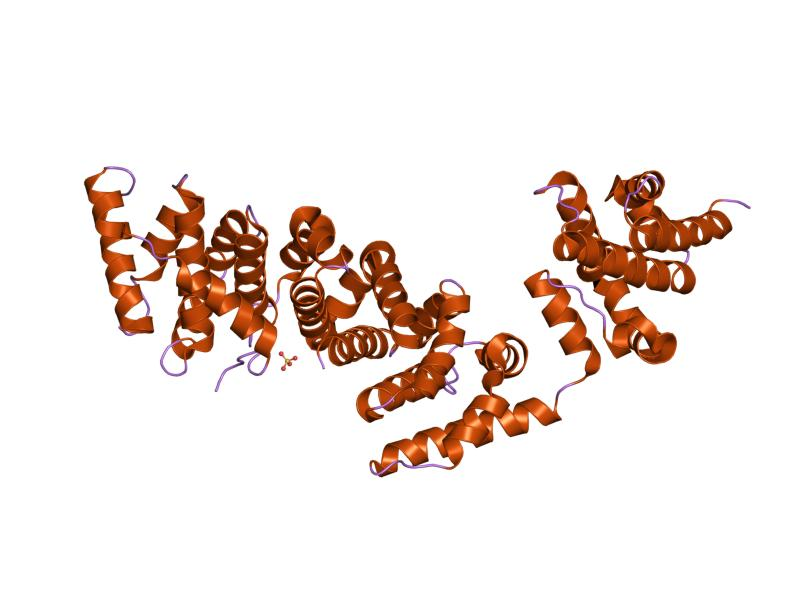
- crystal structure of the regulatory subunit H of the v-type atpase of saccharomyces cerevisiae

Identifiers
- Symbol: V-ATPase_H_N
- Pfam: PF03224
- Pfam clan: CL0020
- InterPro: IPR004908
- SCOP2: 1ho8 / SCOPe / SUPFAM
Available protein structures:
- PDB: IPR004908 PF03224 (ECOD; PDBsum)
- AlphaFold: IPR004908; PF03224

V-ATPase, subunit G

Identifiers
- Symbol: V-ATPase_G
- Pfam: PF03179
- Pfam clan: CL0255
- InterPro: IPR005124
Available protein structures:
- PDB: IPR005124 PF03179 (ECOD; PDBsum)
- AlphaFold: IPR005124; PF03179

Vacuolar-type ATPase (V-ATPase) are a highly conserved evolutionarily ancient enzyme with remarkably diverse functions in eukaryotic organisms. V-ATPases acidify a wide array of intracellular organelles and pump protons across the plasma membranes of numerous cell types. V-ATPases couple the energy of ATP hydrolysis to proton transport across intracellular and plasma membranes of eukaryotic cells. It is generally seen as the polar opposite of ATP synthase because ATP synthase is a proton channel that uses the energy from a proton gradient to produce ATP. V-ATPase however, is a proton pump that uses the energy from ATP hydrolysis to produce a proton gradient.

The Archaea-type ATPase (A-ATPase) is a related group of ATPases found in archaea that often work as an ATP synthase. It forms a clade V/A-ATPase with V-ATPase. Most members of either group shuttle protons (H^{+}), but a few members have evolved to use sodium ions (Na^{+}) instead.

== Roles played by V-ATPases ==
V-ATPases are found within the membranes of many organelles, such as endosomes, lysosomes, and secretory vesicles, where they play a variety of roles crucial for the function of these organelles. For example, the proton gradient across the yeast vacuolar membrane generated by V-ATPases drives calcium uptake into the vacuole through an H^{+}/Ca^{2+} antiporter system. In synaptic transmission in neuronal cells, V-ATPase acidifies synaptic vesicles. Norepinephrine enters vesicles by V-ATPase.

V-ATPases are also found in the plasma membranes of a wide variety of cells such as intercalated cells of the kidney, osteoclasts (bone resorbing cells), macrophages, neutrophils, sperm, midgut cells of insects, and certain tumor cells. Plasma membrane V-ATPases are involved in processes such as pH homeostasis, coupled transport, and tumor metastasis. V-ATPases in the acrosomal membrane of sperm acidify the acrosome. This acidification activates proteases required to drill through the plasma membrane of the egg. V-ATPases in the osteoclast plasma membrane pump protons onto the bone surface, which is necessary for bone resorption. In the intercalated cells of the kidney, V-ATPases pump protons into the urine, allowing for bicarbonate reabsorption into the blood. In addition, other variety of biological processes, such as toxin delivery, viral entry, membrane targeting, apoptosis, regulation of cytoplasmic pH, proteolytic process, and acidification of intracellular systems, are important roles of V-ATPases.

V-ATPases also play a significant role in cell morphogenesis development. Disruption of the gene vma-1 gene which encodes for the catalytic subunit (A) of the enzyme severely impairs the rate of growth, differentiation, and the capacity to produce viable spores in fungus Neurospora crassa.

== Structure ==
The yeast V-ATPase is the best characterized. There are at least thirteen subunits identified to form a functional V-ATPase complex, which consists of two domains. The subunits belong to either the V_{o} domain (membrane associated subunits, lowercase letters on the figure) or the V_{1} domain (peripherally associated subunits, uppercase letters on the figure).

The V_{1} includes eight subunits, A-H, with three copies of the catalytic A and B subunits, three copies of the stator subunits E and G, and one copy of the regulatory C and H subunits. In addition, the V_{1} domain also contains the subunits D and F, which form a central rotor axle. The V_{1} domain contains tissue-specific subunit isoforms including B, C, E, and G. Mutations to the B1 isoform result in the human disease distal renal tubular acidosis and sensorineural deafness.

The V_{o} domain contains six different subunits, a, d, c, c', c", and e, with the stoichiometry of the c ring still a matter of debate with a decamer being postulated for the tobacco hornworm (Manduca sexta) V-ATPase. The mammalian V_{o} domain contains tissue-specific isoforms for subunits a and d, while yeast V-ATPase contains two organelle-specific subunit isoforms of a, Vph1p, and Stv1p. Mutations to the a3 isoform result in the human disease infantile malignant osteopetrosis, and mutations to the a4 isoform result in distal renal tubular acidosis, in some cases with sensorineural deafness.

The V_{1} domain is responsible for ATP hydrolysis, whereas the V_{o} domain is responsible for proton translocation. ATP hydrolysis at the catalytic nucleotide binding sites on subunit A drives rotation of a central stalk composed of subunits D and F, which in turn drives rotation of a barrel of c subunits relative to the a subunit. The complex structure of the V-ATPase has been revealed through the structure of the M. Sexta and Yeast complexes that were solved by single-particle cryo-EM and negative staining, respectively. These structures have revealed that the V-ATPase has a 3-stator network, linked by a collar of density formed by the C, H, and a subunits, which, while dividing the V_{1} and V_{o} domains, make no interactions with the central rotor axle formed by the F, D, and d subunits. Rotation of this central rotor axle caused by the hydrolysis of ATP within the catalytic AB domains results in the movement of the barrel of c subunits past the a subunit, which drives proton transport across the membrane. A stoichiometry of two protons translocated for each ATP hydrolyzed has been proposed by Johnson.

In addition to the structural subunits of yeast V-ATPase, associated proteins that are necessary for assembly have been identified. These associated proteins are essential for V_{o} domain assembly and are termed Vma12p, Vma21p, and Vma22p. Two of the three proteins, Vma12p and Vma22p, form a complex that binds transiently to Vph1p (subunit a) to aid its assembly and maturation. Vma21p coordinates assembly of the V_{o} subunits as well as escorting the V_{o} domain into vesicles for transport to the Golgi.

=== V_{1} ===
The V_{1} domain of the V-ATPase is the site of ATP hydrolysis. Unlike V_{o}, the V_{1} domain is hydrophilic. This soluble domain consists of a hexamer of alternating A and B subunits, a central rotor D, peripheral stators G and E, and regulatory subunits C and H. Hydrolysis of ATP drives a conformational change in the six A|B interfaces and with it rotation of the central rotor D. Unlike with the ATP synthase, the V_{1} domain is not an active ATPase when dissociated.

V_{1} Subunits
Subunit	Human Gene	Note
A, B	ATP6V1A, ATP6V1B1, ATP6V1B2	Catalytic hexamer.
C	ATP6V1C1, ATP6V1C2	
D	ATP6V1D	Central rotor stalk, responsible for ion specificity.
E, G	ATP6V1E1, ATP6V1E2, ATP6V1G1, ATP6V1G2, ATP6V1G3	
F	ATP6V1F	
H	ATP6V1H	

==== Subunit C ====
V-ATPase (Vacuolar-ATPase) C represents the C terminal subunit that is part of the V1 complex, and is localised to the interface between the V1 and Vo complexes.

===== Subunit C function =====
The C subunit plays an essential role in controlling the assembly of V-ATPase, acting as a flexible stator that holds together the catalytic (V1) and membrane (VO) sectors of the enzyme . The release of subunit C from the ATPase complex results in the dissociation of the V1 and Vo subcomplexes, which is an important mechanism in controlling V-ATPase activity in cells. Essentially, by creating a high electrochemical gradient and low pH, this powers the enzyme to create more ATP.

==== Subunits E, G ====
These related subunits make up the stalk(s) of A/V-ATPase. They are important in assembly, and may function as pushrods in activity. E has a cap to connect to A/B, while G does not. They likely evolved from a single protein by gene duplication.

==== Subunit H ====
Subunit H, is only involved in activity and not in assembly. This subunit also acts as an inhibitor of free V1 subunits; it stops ATP hydrolysis when V1 and Vo are dissociated.

=== V_{o} ===
The V_{o} domain is responsible for proton translocation. Unlike the F-type ATP synthase, the V_{o} domain generally transports protons against their own concentration gradient. Rotation of the V_{o} domain transports the protons in movement coordinated with the V_{1} domain, which is responsible for ATP hydrolysis. The V_{o} domain is hydrophobic and composed of several dissociable subunits. These subunits are present in the V_{o} domain to make this a functional proton translocase; they are described below.

V_{o} Subunits
Subunit	Human Gene	Note
a/I	ATP6V0A1, ATP6V0A2, ATP6V0A4	
c	ATP6V0B, ATP6V0C	Ring of varied size.
d/C	ATP6V0D1, ATP6V0D2	
e	ATP6V0E1, ATP6V0E2	9 kDa hydrophobic assembly protein.
AC45/S1	ATP6AP1	Accessory subunit
S2	ATP6AP2	Accessory subunit

==== Subunit a/I ====
The 116kDa subunit (or subunit a) and subunit I are found in the Vo or Ao complex of V- or A-ATPases, respectively. The 116kDa subunit is a transmembrane glycoprotein required for the assembly and proton transport activity of the ATPase complex. Several isoforms of the 116kDa subunit exist, providing a potential role in the differential targeting and regulation of the V-ATPase for specific organelles.

The function of the 116-kDa subunit is not defined, but its predicted structure consists of 6–8 transmembranous sectors, suggesting that it may function similar to subunit a of FO.

==== Subunit d/C ====
Subunit d in V-ATPases, called subunit C in A-ATPases, is a part of the Vo complex. They fit onto the middle of the c ring, so are thought to function as a rotor. There are two versions of this subunit in eukaryotes, d/d1 and d2.

In mammals, d1 (ATP6V0D1) is the ubiquitously expressed version and d2 (ATP6V0D2) is expressed in specific cell types only.

==== Subunit c ====
Similar to the F-type ATP synthase, the transmembrane region of the V-ATPase includes a ring of membrane-spanning subunits that are primarily responsible for proton translocation. Dissimilar from the F-type ATP synthase, however, the V-ATPase has multiple related subunits in the c-ring; in fungi such as yeast there are three related subunits (of varied stoichiometry) and in most other eukaryotes there are two.

== V-ATPase assembly ==
Yeast V-ATPases fail to assemble when any of the genes that encode subunits are deleted except for subunits H and c". Without subunit H, the assembled V-ATPase is not active, and the loss of the c" subunit results in uncoupling of enzymatic activity.

The precise mechanisms by which V-ATPases assembly are still controversial, with evidence suggesting two different possibilities. Mutational analysis and in vitro assays have shown that preassembled V_{o} and V_{1} domains can combine to form one complex in a process called independent assembly. Support for independent assembly includes the findings that the assembled V_{o} domain can be found at the vacuole in the absence of the V_{1} domain, whereas free V_{1} domains can be found in the cytoplasm and not at the vacuole. In contrast, in vivo pulse-chase experiments have revealed early interactions between V_{o} and V_{1} subunits, to be specific, the a and B subunits, suggesting that subunits are added in a step-wise fashion to form a single complex in a concerted assembly process.

== V-ATPase evolution ==
A relatively new technique called ancestral gene resurrection has shed new light on the evolutionary history of the V-ATPase. It has been shown how the V-ATPase structure of the ancestral form consisting of two different proteins evolves into the fungi version with three different proteins. The V-Type ATPase is similar to the archaeal (so called) A-Type ATP synthase, a fact that supports an archaeal origin of eukaryotes (like Eocyte Hypothesis, see also Lokiarchaeota). The exceptional occurrence of some lineages of archaea with F-type and of some lineages of bacteria with A-type ATPase respectively is regarded as a result of horizontal gene transfer.

== Regulation of V-ATPase activity ==
V-ATPases are known to be specifically inhibited by macrolide antibiotics, such as concanamycin (CCA) and balifomycin A1. In vivo regulation of V-ATPase activity is accomplished by reversible dissociation of the V_{1} domain from the V_{o} domain. After initial assembly, both the insect Manduca sexta and yeast V-ATPases can reversibly disassemble into free V_{o} and V_{1} domains after a 2- to 5-minute deprivation of glucose. Reversible disassembly may be a general mechanism of regulating V-ATPase activity, since it exists in yeast and insects. Reassembly is proposed to be aided by a complex termed RAVE (regulator of H^{+}-ATPase of vacuolar and endosomal membranes). Disassembly and reassembly of V-ATPases does not require new protein synthesis but does need an intact microtubular network.

== Human diseases ==
=== Osteopetrosis ===
Osteopetrosis is a generic name that represents a group of heritable conditions in which there is a defect in osteoclastic bone resorption. Both dominant and recessive osteopetrosis occur in humans. Autosomal dominant osteopetrosis shows mild symptoms in adults experiencing frequent bone fractures due to brittle bones. A more severe form of osteopetrosis is termed autosomal recessive infantile malignant osteopetrosis. Three genes that are responsible for recessive osteopetrosis in humans have been identified. Their products are all directly involved in the proton generation and secretion pathways that are essential for bone resorption. One gene is carbonic anhydrase II (CAII), which, when mutated, causes osteopetrosis with renal tubular acidosis (type 3). Mutations to the chloride channel CLC-7 gene also lead to both dominant and recessive osteopetrosis. Approximately 50% of patients with recessive infantile malignant osteopetrosis have mutations to the a3 subunit isoform of V-ATPase. In humans, 26 mutations have been identified in V-ATPase subunit isoform a3, found in osteoclasts, that result in the bone disease autosomal recessive osteopetrosis.

=== Distal renal tubular acidosis (dRTA) ===
The importance of V-ATPase activity in renal proton secretion is highlighted by the inherited disease distal renal tubular acidosis. In all cases, renal tubular acidosis results from a failure of the normal renal mechanisms that regulate systemic pH. There are four types of renal tubular acidosis. Type 1 is distal renal tubular acidosis and results from a failure of the cortical collecting duct to acidify the urine below pH 5. Some patients with autosomal recessive dRTA also have sensorineural hearing loss. Inheritance of this type of RTA results from either mutations to V-ATPase subunit isoform B1 or isoform a4 or mutations of band 3 (also called AE1), a Cl-/HCO3- exchanger. Twelve different mutations to V-ATPase isoform B1 and twenty-four different mutations in a4 lead to dRTA. Reverse transcription polymerase chain reaction studies have shown expression of the a4 subunit in the intercalated cell of the kidney and in the cochlea. dRTA caused by mutations in the a4 subunit gene in some cases can be associated with deafness due to a failure to normally acidify the endolymph of the inner ear.

=== X-linked myopathy with excessive autophagy (XMEA) ===
X-linked myopathy with excessive autophagy is a rare genetic disease resulting from mutations in the VMA21 gene. The disease has a childhood onset and results in a slowly progressive muscle weakness, typically beginning in the legs, and some patients can eventually require wheelchair assistance with advanced age. The Vma21 protein assists in assembly of the V-ATPase, and XMEA-associated mutations result in decreased activity of the V-ATPase and increased lysosomal pH.

== Nomenclature ==
The term V_{o} has a lowercase letter "o" (not the number "zero") in subscript. The "o" stands for oligomycin, which binds to the homologous region in F-ATPase. It is worth noting that the human gene notations at NCBI designate it as "zero" rather than the letter "o". For example, the gene for the human c subunit of Vo is listed in NCBI gene database as "ATP6V0C" (with a zero), rather than "ATP6VOC" (with an "o"). Many pieces of literature make this mistake as well.

== See also ==
- ATP synthase
- F-ATPase
- Na+/K+-ATPase
- P-type ATPase
