= List of gene families =

This is a list of gene families or gene complexes, i.e. sets of genes which are related ancestrally and often serve similar biological functions. These gene families typically encode functionally related proteins, and sometimes the term gene families is a shorthand for the sets of proteins that the genes encode. They may or may not be physically adjacent on the same chromosome.

== Regulatory protein gene families ==
- 14-3-3 protein family
- Achaete-scute complex (neuroblast formation)
- Cyclins
- Cyclin dependent kinases
- CDK inhibitors
- FOX proteins (forkhead box proteins)
- Families containing homeobox domains
  - DLX gene family
  - Hox gene family
  - POU family
- GATA transcription factor
- General transcription factor
- Krüppel-type zinc finger (ZNF)
- MADS-box gene family
- NF-kB
- NOTCH2NL
- Nuclear receptor
- P300-CBP coactivator family
- Transcription factors
- SOX gene family

== Immune system proteins ==
- Immunoglobulin superfamily
- Killer-cell immunoglobulin-like receptors
- Leukocyte immunoglobulin-like receptors
- Major histocompatibility complex (MHC)
- NOD-like receptors
- Pattern recognition receptor
- Toll-like receptors
- RIG-I like receptors

== Motor proteins ==
- Dynein
- Kinesin
- Myosin

== Signal transducing proteins ==
- Arf family
- G-proteins
- Janus kinases
- MAP Kinase
- Non-receptor tyrosine kinase
- Olfactory receptor
- Peroxiredoxin
- Rab family
- Rap family
- Ras family
- Receptor tyrosine kinases
- Rho family
- Serine/threonine-specific protein kinase
- SRC kinase family

== Transporters ==
- ABC transporters
- Antiporter
- Aquaporins
- Globin
- Major facilitator superfamily
- Neurotransmitter transporter
  - GABA transporter
  - Glutamate transporter
  - Glycine transporter
  - Monoamine transporter
  - Equilibrative nucleoside transporter family
- Papain-like protease
- Solute carrier family

== Other families ==
- ATCase/OTCase family
- Bacterial potassium transporter
- DHH phosphatase family
- Expansin gene family
- Fibroblast growth factors (FGF)
- Fibroblast growth factor receptors (FGFR)
- FH2 protein (formin) gene family
- FGD (FYVE, RhoGEF and PH domain containing) family
- Heat shock proteins
- Heat shock factor
- Ion channels
- Membrane-spanning 4A
- Peroxin
- Protocadherin gene family
- Roundabout family
- SNARE family

== See also ==
- Protein family
- Housekeeping gene
