= Trk =

TRK or trk may refer to:

- Juwata International Airport (IATA code: TRK), an international airport in Tarakan, North Kalimantan, Indonesia
- Potassium transport proteins (Trk), a constituent of the protein family bacterial potassium transporter
- Trk receptor, a family of tyrosine kinases that regulates synaptic strength and plasticity in the mammalian nervous system
- Truckee Tahoe Airport (FAA LID code: TRK), a public airport two miles east of Truckee, California, United States
- Turkic languages (ISO 639-5 code: trk), a language family of at least 35 documented languages
- Berliet TRK, a range of heavy-duty trucks
