= DHH =

DHH may refer to:

== Science and technology ==
- Desert hedgehog (protein), a protein encoded by the Dhh gene
- DHH phosphatase family, a family of putative phosphoesterases

== Other uses ==
- Barkol Dahe Airport (IATA: DHH) in Xinjiang, China
- Desi hip-hop, a subgenre of hip hop music
- Dhh, a 2017 Indian children's film
- David Heinemeier Hansson, Danish computer programmer
- Louisiana Department of Health and Hospitals, former name of Louisiana Department of Health, US
