= ATP6V0B =

Protein-coding gene in humans

Identifiers
- Aliases: ATP6V0B, ATP6F, HATPL, VMA16, ATPase H+ transporting V0 subunit b
- External IDs: OMIM: 603717; MGI: 1890510; GeneCards: ATP6V0B

Gene location (Human)
Chr.	Chromosome 1 (human)
Band	1p34.1	Start	43,974,487 bp
Band	1p34.1	End	43,978,295 bp

Gene location (Mouse)
Chr.	Chromosome 4 (mouse)
Band	4|4 D1	Start	117,741,523 bp
Band	4|4 D1	End	117,744,530 bp
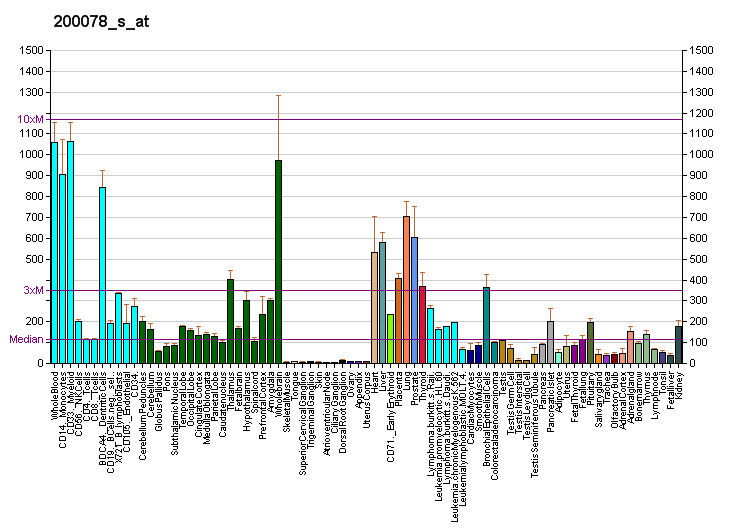
RNA expression pattern
Bgee	Human / Mouse (ortholog); Top expressed in: granulocyte; anterior pituitary; monocyte; prefrontal cortex; body of pancreas; mucosa of transverse colon; blood; right frontal lobe; periodontal fiber; right adrenal gland / Top expressed in: facial motor nucleus; neural layer of retina; granulocyte; primary visual cortex; choroid plexus of fourth ventricle; superior frontal gyrus; right kidney; vestibular membrane of cochlear duct; stroma of bone marrow; perirhinal cortex; More reference expression data
BioGPS	More reference expression data
Gene ontology
Molecular function	proton transmembrane transporter activity; proton-transporting ATPase activity, rotational mechanism; transporter activity
Cellular component	vacuole; vacuolar membrane; membrane; vacuolar proton-transporting V-type ATPase, V0 domain; proton-transporting V-type ATPase, V0 domain; phagocytic vesicle membrane; endosome membrane; proton-transporting two-sector ATPase complex, proton-transporting domain; integral component of membrane
Biological process	regulation of macroautophagy; vacuolar acidification; ion transmembrane transport; insulin receptor signaling pathway; ion transport; transferrin transport; proton transmembrane transport; phagosome acidification
Sources:Amigo / QuickGO
Orthologs
Databases	NCBI: entry; OMA: entry
Species	Human	Mouse
Entrez	533	114143
Ensembl	ENSG00000117410	ENSMUSG00000033379
UniProt	Q99437	Q91V37
RefSeq (mRNA)	NM_004047; NM_001039457; NM_001294333	NM_033617
RefSeq (protein)	NP_001034546; NP_001281262; NP_004038	NP_291095
Location (UCSC)	Chr 1: 43.97 – 43.98 Mb	Chr 4: 117.74 – 117.74 Mb
PubMed search
- Wikidata
View/Edit Human	View/Edit Mouse

V-type proton ATPase 21 kDa proteolipid subunit is an enzyme that in humans is encoded by the ATP6V0B gene.

This gene encodes a component of vacuolar ATPase (V-ATPase), a multisubunit enzyme that mediates acidification of eukaryotic intracellular organelles. V-ATPase dependent organelle acidification is necessary for such intracellular processes as protein sorting, zymogen activation, receptor-mediated endocytosis, and synaptic vesicle proton gradient generation. V-ATPase is composed of a cytosolic V1 domain and a transmembrane V0 domain. The V1 domain consists of three A and three B subunits, two G subunits, plus the C, D, E, F, and H subunits. The V1 domain contains the ATP catalytic site. The V0 domain consists of five different subunits: a, c, c', c'', and d.

Additional isoforms of many of the V1 and V0 subunit proteins are encoded by multiple genes, or alternatively spliced transcript variants. This encoded protein is part of the transmembrane V0 domain, and is the human counterpart of yeast VMA16. Two alternatively spliced transcript variants that encode different proteins have been found for this gene.
