= ATP6V1B1 =

Protein-coding gene in humans

Identifiers
- Aliases: ATP6V1B1, ATP6B1, RTA1B, VATB, VMA2, VPP3, ATPase H+ transporting V1 subunit B1, DRTA2
- External IDs: OMIM: 192132; MGI: 103285; GeneCards: ATP6V1B1

Gene location (Human)
| Chr. | Chromosome 2 (human) |
| Band | 2p13.3 | Start | 70,935,900 bp |
| Band | 2p13.3 | End | 70,965,431 bp |

Gene location (Mouse)
| Chr. | Chromosome 6 (mouse) |
| Band | 6 C3|6 35.94 cM | Start | 83,719,972 bp |
| Band | 6 C3|6 35.94 cM | End | 83,735,837 bp |
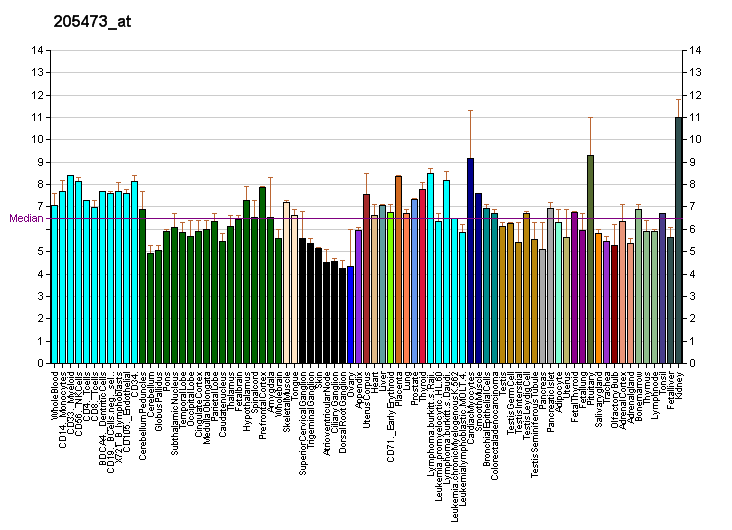
RNA expression pattern
| Bgee | Human / Mouse (ortholog); Top expressed in: right uterine tube; testicle; human kidney; skin of leg; minor salivary glands; skin of abdomen; olfactory zone of nasal mucosa; canal of the cervix; body of pancreas; stromal cell of endometrium / Top expressed in: right kidney; inner renal medulla; human kidney; connecting tubule; nose; olfactory system; upper respiratory tract; olfactory epithelium; trigeminal nerve; hair; More reference expression data |
| BioGPS | More reference expression data |
Gene ontology
| Molecular function | protein-containing complex binding; proton transmembrane transporter activity; hydrolase activity; ATP binding |
| Cellular component | cytoplasm; proton-transporting V-type ATPase, V1 domain; cytosol; lateral plasma membrane; membrane; microvillus; basolateral plasma membrane; apical plasma membrane; vacuolar proton-transporting V-type ATPase complex; extracellular exosome; endomembrane system; synaptic vesicle; extrinsic component of synaptic vesicle membrane |
| Biological process | insulin receptor signaling pathway; excretion; calcium ion homeostasis; transferrin transport; pH reduction; ossification; ion transport; hearing; ion transmembrane transport; ATP metabolic process; inner ear morphogenesis; regulation of macroautophagy; regulation of pH; phagosome acidification; transport; proton transmembrane transport; renal water homeostasis; renal sodium ion transport; prostaglandin metabolic process; regulation of gene expression; adult behavior; renal sodium excretion; olfactory behavior; chloride ion homeostasis; potassium ion homeostasis |
Sources:Amigo / QuickGO
Orthologs
| Databases | NCBI: entry; OMA: entry |
| Species | Human | Mouse |
| Entrez | 525 | 110935 |
| Ensembl | ENSG00000116039 | ENSMUSG00000006269 |
| UniProt | P15313 | Q91YH6 |
| RefSeq (mRNA) | NM_001692 | NM_134157 |
| RefSeq (protein) | NP_001683 | NP_598918 |
| Location (UCSC) | Chr 2: 70.94 – 70.97 Mb | Chr 6: 83.72 – 83.74 Mb |
| PubMed search |
- Wikidata
| View/Edit Human | View/Edit Mouse |

V-type proton ATPase subunit B, kidney isoform is an enzyme that in humans is encoded by the ATP6V1B1 gene.

This gene encodes a component of vacuolar ATPase (V-ATPase), a multisubunit enzyme that mediates acidification of eukaryotic intracellular organelles. V-ATPase dependent organelle acidification is necessary for such intracellular processes as protein sorting, zymogen activation, receptor-mediated endocytosis, and synaptic vesicle proton gradient generation. V-ATPase is composed of a cytosolic V1 domain and a transmembrane V0 domain. The V1 domain consists of three A and three B subunits, two G subunits plus the C, D, E, F, and H subunits. The V1 domain contains the ATP catalytic site. The V0 domain consists of five different subunits: a, c, c', c' ', and d. Additional isoforms of many of the V1 and V0 subunit proteins are encoded by multiple genes or alternatively spliced transcript variants. This encoded protein is one of two V1 domain B subunit isoforms and is found in the kidney. Mutations in this gene cause distal renal tubular acidosis associated with sensorineural deafness.
