= ATP6V1C2 =

Protein-coding gene in humans

Identifiers
- Aliases: ATP6V1C2, ATP6C2, VMA5, ATPase H+ transporting V1 subunit C2
- External IDs: OMIM: 618070; MGI: 1916025; GeneCards: ATP6V1C2

Gene location (Human)
Chr.	Chromosome 2 (human)
Band	2p25.1	Start	10,721,100 bp
Band	2p25.1	End	10,785,110 bp

Gene location (Mouse)
Chr.	Chromosome 12 (mouse)
Band	12|12 A1.1	Start	17,334,722 bp
Band	12|12 A1.1	End	17,379,360 bp
RNA expression pattern
Bgee	Human / Mouse (ortholog); Top expressed in: skin of abdomen; skin of leg; secondary oocyte; minor salivary glands; anterior pituitary; human kidney; olfactory zone of nasal mucosa; skin of thigh; parotid gland; placenta / Top expressed in: lip; esophagus; skin of external ear; olfactory epithelium; left lung; right kidney; left lung lobe; right lung; right lung lobe; skin of back; More reference expression data
BioGPS	n/a
Gene ontology
Molecular function	protein binding; protein dimerization activity; proton transmembrane transporter activity; P-type proton-exporting transporter activity; proton-transporting ATPase activity, rotational mechanism
Cellular component	proton-transporting V-type ATPase, V1 domain; lysosomal membrane; cytosol; extracellular exosome; vacuolar proton-transporting V-type ATPase, V1 domain
Biological process	positive regulation of Wnt signaling pathway; insulin receptor signaling pathway; ion transmembrane transport; ion transport; transferrin transport; regulation of macroautophagy; phagosome acidification; transport
Sources:Amigo / QuickGO
Orthologs
Databases	NCBI: entry; OMA: entry
Species	Human	Mouse
Entrez	245973	68775
Ensembl	ENSG00000143882	ENSMUSG00000020566
UniProt	Q8NEY4	Q99L60
RefSeq (mRNA)	NM_001039362; NM_144583	NM_001159632; NM_133699
RefSeq (protein)	NP_001034451; NP_653184	NP_001153104; NP_598460
Location (UCSC)	Chr 2: 10.72 – 10.79 Mb	Chr 12: 17.33 – 17.38 Mb
PubMed search
- Wikidata
View/Edit Human	View/Edit Mouse

V-type proton ATPase subunit C 2 is an enzyme that in humans is encoded by the ATP6V1C2 gene.

This gene encodes a component of vacuolar ATPase (V-ATPase), a multisubunit enzyme that mediates acidification of eukaryotic intracellular organelles. V-ATPase dependent organelle acidification is necessary for such intracellular processes as protein sorting, zymogen activation, receptor-mediated endocytosis, and synaptic vesicle proton gradient generation.

V-ATPase is composed of a cytosolic V1 domain and a transmembrane V0 domain. The V1 domain consists of three A, three B, and two G subunits, as well as a C, D, E, F, and H subunit. The V1 domain contains the ATP catalytic site. This gene encodes alternate transcriptional splice variants, encoding different V1 domain C subunit isoforms.
