= ATP6V1B2 =

Protein-coding gene in the species Homo sapiens

Identifiers
- Aliases: ATP6V1B2, ATP6B1B2, ATP6B2, HO57, VATB, VPP3, Vma2, ATPase H+ transporting V1 subunit B2, DOOD, ZLS2
- External IDs: OMIM: 606939; MGI: 109618; GeneCards: ATP6V1B2

Gene location (Human)
Chr.	Chromosome 8 (human)
Band	8p21.3	Start	20,197,381 bp
Band	8p21.3	End	20,226,819 bp

Gene location (Mouse)
Chr.	Chromosome 8 (mouse)
Band	8|8 B3.3	Start	69,541,298 bp
Band	8|8 B3.3	End	69,566,363 bp
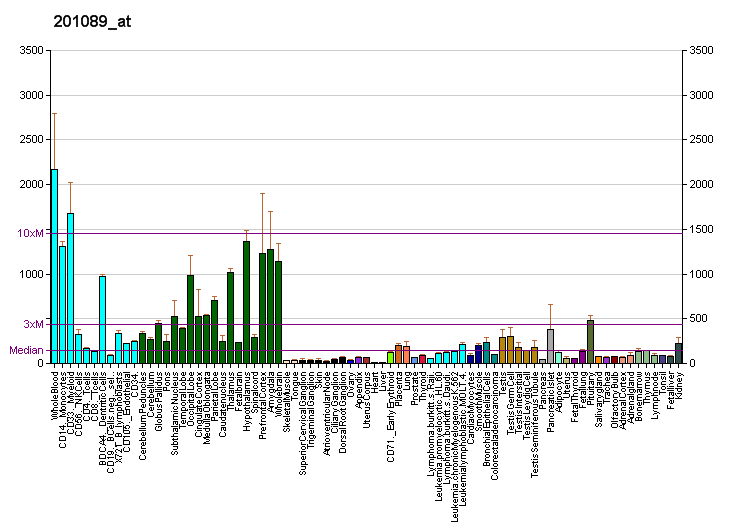
RNA expression pattern
Bgee	Human / Mouse (ortholog); Top expressed in: pons; monocyte; lateral nuclear group of thalamus; prefrontal cortex; Brodmann area 10; orbitofrontal cortex; frontal pole; pars compacta; dorsolateral prefrontal cortex; superior vestibular nucleus / Top expressed in: pontine nuclei; perirhinal cortex; central gray substance of midbrain; entorhinal cortex; cingulate gyrus; CA3 field; medial vestibular nucleus; inferior colliculi; primary motor cortex; medial dorsal nucleus; More reference expression data
BioGPS	More reference expression data
Gene ontology
Molecular function	proton-transporting ATPase activity, rotational mechanism; protein binding; proton transmembrane transporter activity; hydrolase activity; ATP binding
Cellular component	cytoplasm; integral component of membrane; proton-transporting V-type ATPase, V1 domain; cytosol; intracellular membrane-bounded organelle; membrane; melanosome; ruffle; myelin sheath; plasma membrane; microvillus; lysosomal membrane; extracellular exosome; endomembrane system; apical plasma membrane
Biological process	insulin receptor signaling pathway; transferrin transport; ion transport; ion transmembrane transport; ATP metabolic process; regulation of macroautophagy; phagosome acidification; transport; proton transmembrane transport
Sources:Amigo / QuickGO
Orthologs
Databases	NCBI: entry; OMA: entry
Species	Human	Mouse
Entrez	526	11966
Ensembl	ENSG00000147416	ENSMUSG00000006273
UniProt	P21281	P62814
RefSeq (mRNA)	NM_001693	NM_007509
RefSeq (protein)	NP_001684	NP_031535
Location (UCSC)	Chr 8: 20.2 – 20.23 Mb	Chr 8: 69.54 – 69.57 Mb
PubMed search
- Wikidata
View/Edit Human	View/Edit Mouse

V-type proton ATPase subunit B, brain isoform is an enzyme that in humans is encoded by the ATP6V1B2 gene.

This gene encodes a component of vacuolar ATPase (V-ATPase), a multisubunit enzyme that mediates acidification of eukaryotic intracellular organelles. V-ATPase dependent organelle acidification is necessary for such intracellular processes as protein sorting, zymogen activation, receptor-mediated endocytosis, and synaptic vesicle proton gradient generation. V-ATPase is composed of a cytosolic V1 domain and a transmembrane V0 domain. The V1 domain consists of three A, three B, and two G subunits, as well as a C, D, E, F, and H subunit. The V1 domain contains the ATP catalytic site. The protein encoded by this gene is one of two V1 domain B subunit isoforms and is the only B isoform highly expressed in osteoclasts.

In melanocytic cells ATP6V1B2 gene expression may be regulated by MITF.
