= ATP6V1F =

Protein-coding gene in the species Homo sapiens

Identifiers
- Aliases: ATP6V1F, ATP6S14, VATF, Vma7, ATPase H+ transporting V1 subunit F
- External IDs: OMIM: 607160; MGI: 1913394; GeneCards: ATP6V1F

Gene location (Human)
Chr.	Chromosome 7 (human)
Band	7q32.1	Start	128,862,856 bp
Band	7q32.1	End	128,865,847 bp

Gene location (Mouse)
Chr.	Chromosome 6 (mouse)
Band	6|6 A3.3	Start	29,467,717 bp
Band	6|6 A3.3	End	29,470,511 bp
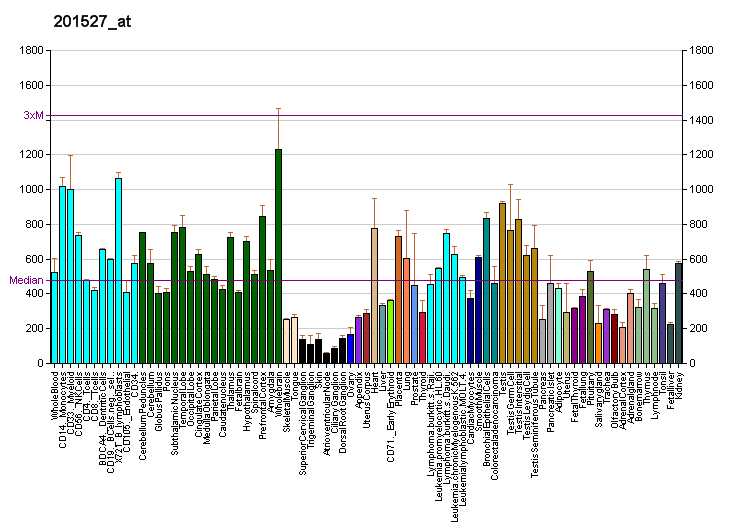
RNA expression pattern
Bgee	Human / Mouse (ortholog); Top expressed in: prefrontal cortex; left testis; right testis; right frontal lobe; cingulate gyrus; anterior cingulate cortex; monocyte; nucleus accumbens; amygdala; right hemisphere of cerebellum / Top expressed in: right kidney; yolk sac; human kidney; proximal tubule; olfactory bulb; cerebellum; lens; urinary bladder; dentate gyrus of hippocampal formation granule cell; hippocampus proper; More reference expression data
BioGPS	More reference expression data
Gene ontology
Molecular function	protein binding; proton-transporting ATPase activity, rotational mechanism; proton transmembrane transporter activity; ATPase-coupled ion transmembrane transporter activity; ATPase activity
Cellular component	proton-transporting V-type ATPase, V1 domain; cytosol; proton-transporting two-sector ATPase complex; vacuolar proton-transporting V-type ATPase complex; membrane; extracellular exosome
Biological process	insulin receptor signaling pathway; ion transport; transferrin transport; phagosome acidification; ion transmembrane transport; transport; proton transmembrane transport
Sources:Amigo / QuickGO
Orthologs
Databases	NCBI: entry; OMA: entry
Species	Human	Mouse
Entrez	9296	66144
Ensembl	ENSG00000128524	ENSMUSG00000004285
UniProt	Q16864	Q9D1K2
RefSeq (mRNA)	NM_004231; NM_001198909	NM_025381
RefSeq (protein)	NP_001185838; NP_004222	NP_079657
Location (UCSC)	Chr 7: 128.86 – 128.87 Mb	Chr 6: 29.47 – 29.47 Mb
PubMed search
- Wikidata
View/Edit Human	View/Edit Mouse

ATP-synt_F

Identifiers
- Symbol: ATP-synt_F
- Pfam: PF01990
- InterPro: IPR008218
Available protein structures:
- PDB: IPR008218 PF01990 (ECOD; PDBsum)
- AlphaFold: IPR008218; PF01990

V-type proton ATPase subunit F is an enzyme that in humans is encoded by the ATP6V1F gene.

This gene encodes a component of vacuolar ATPase (V-ATPase), a multisubunit enzyme that mediates acidification of eukaryotic intracellular organelles. V-ATPase dependent organelle acidification is necessary for such intracellular processes as protein sorting, zymogen activation, receptor-mediated endocytosis, and synaptic vesicle proton gradient generation. V-ATPase is composed of a cytosolic V1 domain and a transmembrane V0 domain. The V1 domain consists of three A and three B subunits, two G subunits plus the C, D, E, F, and H subunits. The V1 domain contains the ATP catalytic site. The V0 domain consists of five different subunits: a, c, c', c", and d. Additional isoforms of many of the V1 and V0 subunit proteins are encoded by multiple genes or alternatively spliced transcript variants. This encoded protein is the V1 domain F subunit protein.

Subunit F is a 16 kDa protein that is required for the assembly and activity of V-ATPase, and has a potential role in the differential targeting and regulation of the enzyme for specific organelles. This subunit is not necessary for the rotation of the ATPase V1 rotor, but it does promote catalysis.
