= Renault R =

Renault R-series
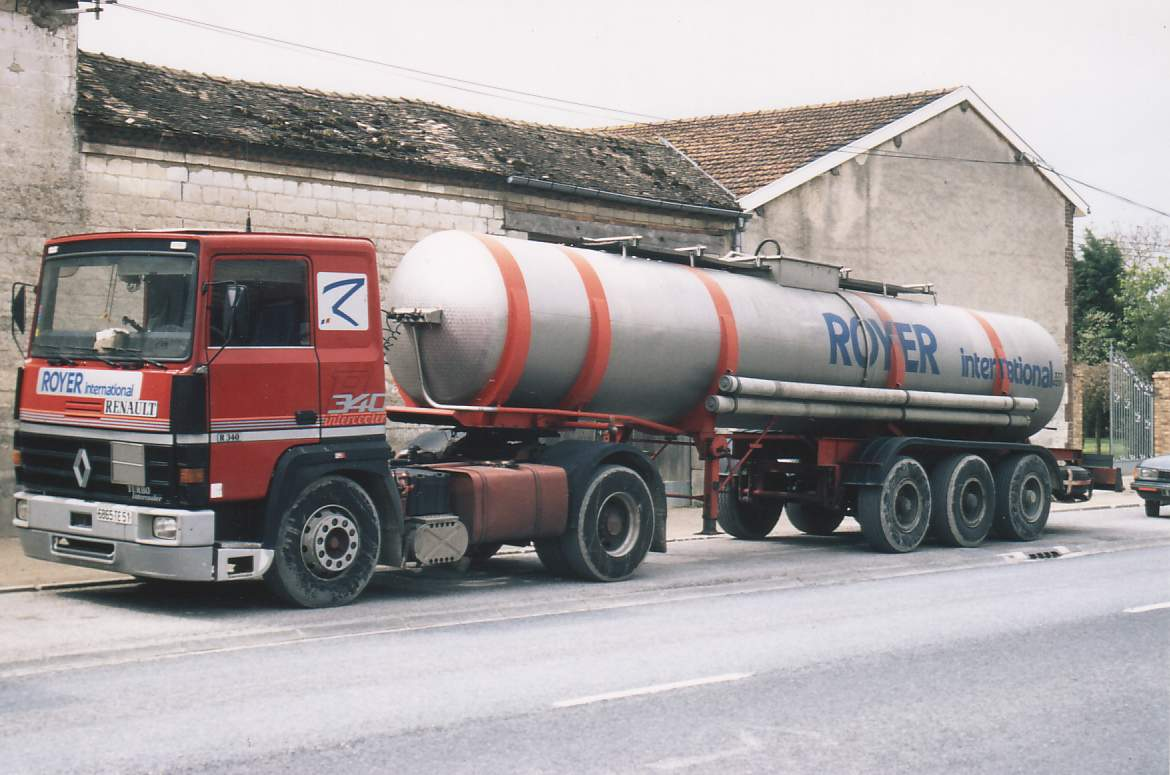
- Late eighties Renault R340

Overview
- Manufacturer: Renault Trucks
- Also called: Ford Transcontinental
- Production: 1980-1996

Body and chassis
- Class: Heavy truck
- Body style: COE
- Related: Ford Transcontinental

Powertrain
- Engine: Straight-six engine * G-series (9.8 L) * G-series (12.0 L); V8 engine (14.88 L)

Chronology
- Predecessor: Berliet GR/TR
- Successor: Renault Premium

The Renault R-series is a range of heavy-duty trucks built by Renault Véhicles Industrielles (RVI) from 1980 until 1996. The cabin was Berliet's KB 2400 model, originally introduced in 1970 for their GR/TR range. The fusion of Saviem and Berliet into RVI brought with it a consolidation of the lineups, although the Saviem and Berliet badges continued to be used for some time. The KB 2400 cabin was also used by Ford Transcontinental. The R-series ranged from the smallest R280 to the V8-powered R420.

== History ==
Originally built by Berliet, the truck became the top-of-the-line offering in Renault's new heavy commercial vehicle line. Sold as the R-series, it offered a range of engines in models from the original R310 up to the V8-engined R420. Most models were inline-sixes. The R-series overlapped the more compact, more utilitarian G-series, and was meant for longer distance journeys where driver comfort is of more importance.

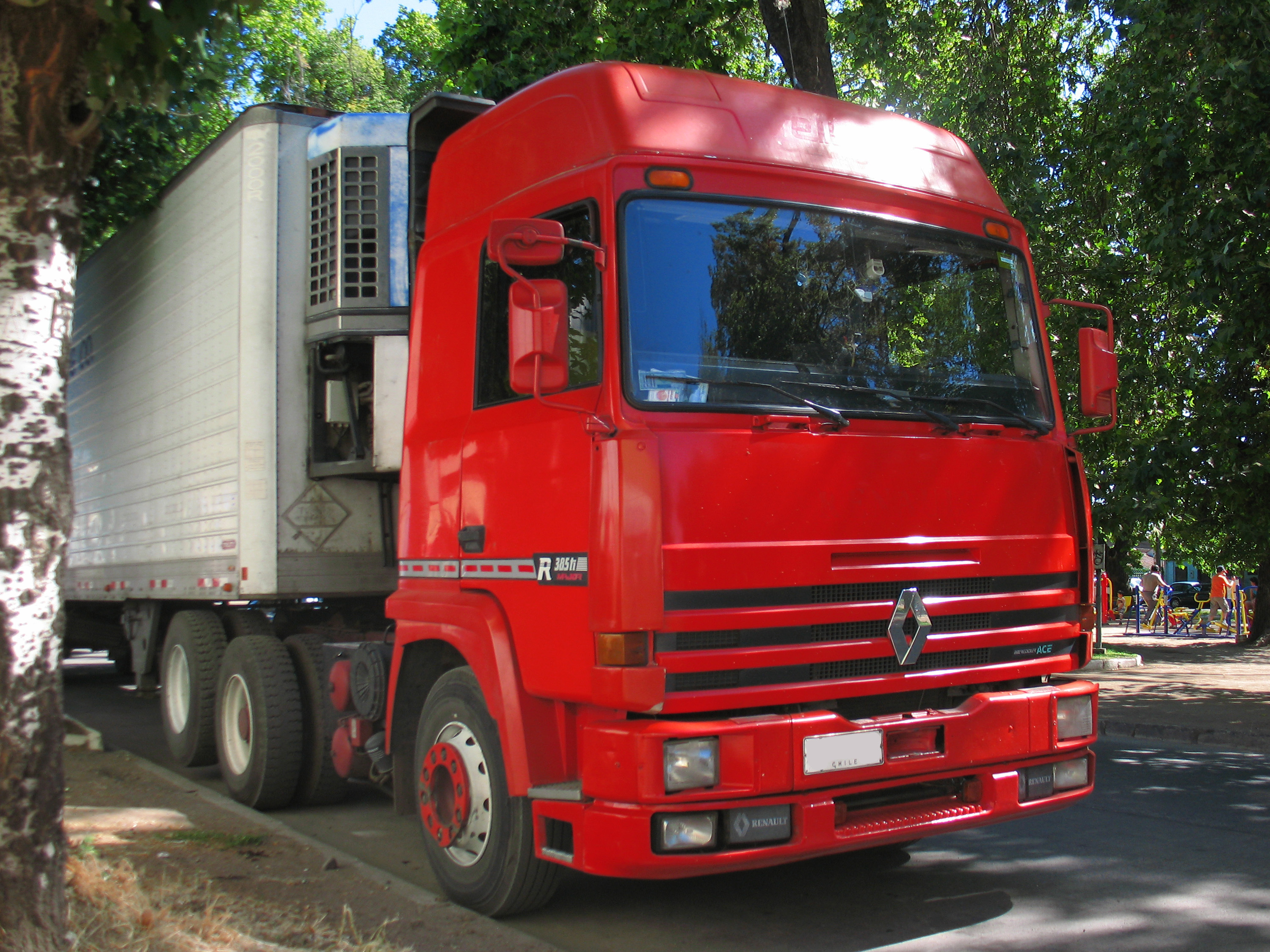
1997 Renault R385 ti Major

The 338 PS (249 kW) R340 appeared at the 1986 Paris Salon, being a modified version of the twelve-litre inline-six also used in the R310. A high-roofed model with a bonded and riveted fibreglass extension called the Turboliner was also sold, beginning in 1986. In 1990 the R-series received a facelift, with a body-colored grille and a more aerodynamic appearance. In 1992 the line was renamed Renault Major. In 1996, the R-series was replaced by the new Renault Premium.

=== Engines ===
The R was mostly equipped with Renault's 12-litre, G-series turbodiesel inline-six, although some higher powered models (R360, 370, 390, 420) received a 14.88 L V8 unit. The smaller 9.8 liter G-series engine was also available in the R330 and the R340 ti. The most powerful six was the 385 PS (283 kW) R385 ti of the 1990s. Eight-cylinder models' bodyshell was actually coded KB 2480.
