= Ford Transcontinental =

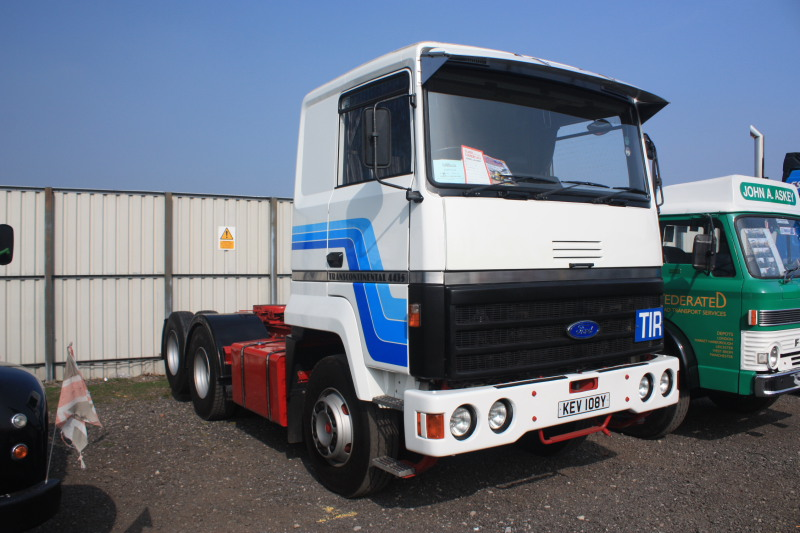

Overview
- Manufacturer: Ford
- Production: 1975-1984
- Designer: Louis Lepoix

Body and chassis
- Body style: Cab over
- Related: Berliet GR/TR

Powertrain
- Engine: Diesel (Cummins)
- Transmission: Eaton-Fuller 9 and 13-Speeds

Chronology
- Predecessor: Ford FK
- Successor: Ford Cargo

The Ford Transcontinental is a heavy goods vehicle tractor and rigid unit that was manufactured between 1975 and 1984 by Ford Europe in the Netherlands and Britain. A total of 8735 units was produced, 8231 in Amsterdam and another 504 at the Foden VAP in Sandbach, Cheshire, UK.

Assembled almost entirely from bought-in OEM component parts (e.g., the KB 2400 cab shell from the Berliet GR/TR, engines from Cummins, transmission from Eaton), it was introduced to fill a perceived gap in the market in anticipation of the relaxation of weight restrictions on HGVs, and as such, had a very strong chassis and heavy duty suspension. The Berliet KB 2400 cab was also used by Renault for their R-series.

Recognizable by its high cab, it was an advanced vehicle for its time, offering a high standard of driver comfort and a high power output for its time, courtesy of the 14-litre Cummins engine with typical outputs of 290-350 HP. The engines were originally of the Cummins NTC generation, but were gradually updated to the new "big-cam" (NTE) generation - a process completed by 1979. Also, the Ford Transcontinental is noted for having oil and water meters on the dashboard, another example of the unit being ahead of its time.

Sales did not live up to expectations, mainly because the tractor unit with its heavy-duty construction was too heavy for the 32-ton weight limit in the UK at the time, although it was a popular vehicle with drivers, particularly those who were engaged on long-distance continental work. The model was updated continuously, with much work carried out to lighten the heavy chassis.

Today, the Transcontinental is a rare vehicle, much in favour with collectors of vintage commercials, although a few do remain in revenue-earning service throughout Europe.

== See also ==
- Ford Cargo
