= ATP6V1E1 =

Protein-coding gene in the species Homo sapiens

Identifiers
- Aliases: ATP6V1E1, ATP6E, ATP6E2, ATP6V1E, P31, Vma4, ATPase H+ transporting V1 subunit E1, ARCL2C
- External IDs: OMIM: 108746; MGI: 894326; GeneCards: ATP6V1E1

Gene location (Human)
Chr.	Chromosome 22 (human)
Band	22q11.21	Start	17,592,136 bp
Band	22q11.21	End	17,628,749 bp

Gene location (Mouse)
Chr.	Chromosome 6 (mouse)
Band	6 F1|6 57.01 cM	Start	120,771,266 bp
Band	6 F1|6 57.01 cM	End	120,799,754 bp
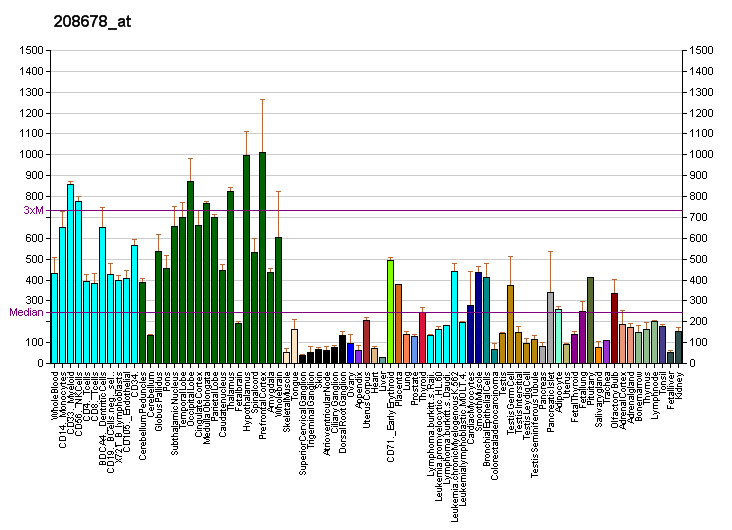
RNA expression pattern
Bgee	Human / Mouse (ortholog); Top expressed in: middle temporal gyrus; prefrontal cortex; pons; right frontal lobe; Brodmann area 9; C1 segment; cingulate gyrus; anterior cingulate cortex; Brodmann area 46; nucleus accumbens / Top expressed in: facial motor nucleus; dentate gyrus of hippocampal formation granule cell; anterior horn of spinal cord; superior frontal gyrus; primary visual cortex; right kidney; Epithelium of choroid plexus; barrel cortex; pontine nuclei; retinal pigment epithelium; More reference expression data
BioGPS	More reference expression data
Gene ontology
Molecular function	ATPase binding; proton-transporting ATPase activity, rotational mechanism; P-type proton-exporting transporter activity; protein binding; hydrolase activity
Cellular component	cytoplasm; cytosol; endosome; proton-transporting two-sector ATPase complex; microvillus; lysosomal membrane; apical plasma membrane; mitochondrion; proton-transporting two-sector ATPase complex, catalytic domain; extracellular exosome
Biological process	insulin receptor signaling pathway; transferrin transport; ion transport; ion transmembrane transport; regulation of macroautophagy; phagosome acidification; transport; proton transmembrane transport
Sources:Amigo / QuickGO
Orthologs
Databases	NCBI: entry; OMA: entry
Species	Human	Mouse
Entrez	529	11973
Ensembl	ENSG00000131100	ENSMUSG00000019210
UniProt	P36543; Q53Y06	P50518
RefSeq (mRNA)	NM_001696; NM_001039366; NM_001039367	NM_007510
RefSeq (protein)	NP_001034455; NP_001034456; NP_001687; NP_001687.1	NP_031536
Location (UCSC)	Chr 22: 17.59 – 17.63 Mb	Chr 6: 120.77 – 120.8 Mb
PubMed search
- Wikidata
View/Edit Human	View/Edit Mouse

V-type proton ATPase subunit E 1 is an enzyme that in humans is encoded by the ATP6V1E1 gene.

This gene encodes a component of vacuolar ATPase (V-ATPase), a multisubunit enzyme that mediates acidification of eukaryotic intracellular organelles. V-ATPase dependent organelle acidification is necessary for such intracellular processes as protein sorting, zymogen activation, receptor-mediated endocytosis, and synaptic vesicle proton gradient generation. V-ATPase is composed of a cytosolic V1 domain and a transmembrane V0 domain. The V1 domain consists of three A, three B, and two G subunits, as well as a C, D, E, F, and H subunit. The V1 domain contains the ATP catalytic site. This gene encodes alternate transcriptional splice variants, encoding different V1 domain E subunit isoforms. Pseudogenes for this gene have been found in the genome.
