= ATP6V0E1 =

Protein-coding gene in the species Homo sapiens

Identifiers
- Aliases: ATP6V0E1, ATP6H, ATP6V0E, M9.2, Vma21, Vma21p, ATPase H+ transporting V0 subunit e1
- External IDs: OMIM: 603931; MGI: 1328318; GeneCards: ATP6V0E1

Gene location (Human)
Chr.	Chromosome 5 (human)
Band	5q35.1	Start	172,983,771 bp
Band	5q35.1	End	173,035,445 bp

Gene location (Mouse)
Chr.	Chromosome 17 (mouse)
Band	17|17 A3.3	Start	26,882,205 bp
Band	17|17 A3.3	End	26,918,621 bp
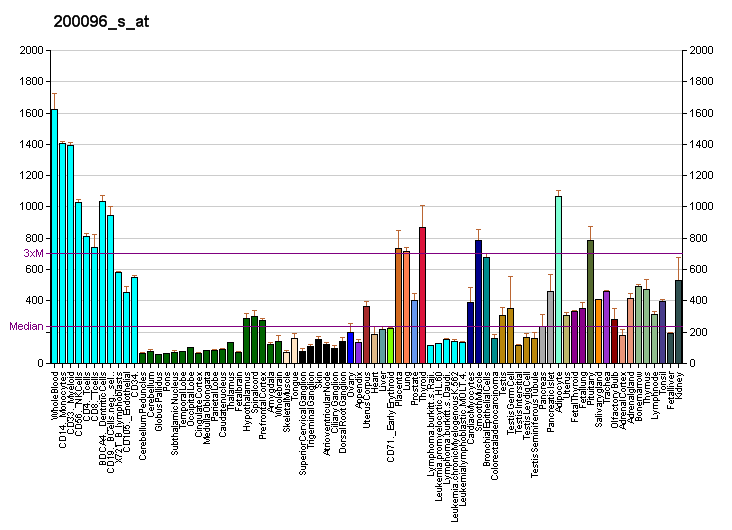
RNA expression pattern
Bgee	Human / Mouse (ortholog); Top expressed in: epithelium of nasopharynx; corpus epididymis; endothelial cell; palpebral conjunctiva; gingival epithelium; stromal cell of endometrium; kidney tubule; tail of epididymis; periodontal fiber; anterior pituitary / Top expressed in: choroid plexus of fourth ventricle; medullary collecting duct; transitional epithelium of urinary bladder; right kidney; calvaria; Epithelium of choroid plexus; renal corpuscle; granulocyte; vestibular membrane of cochlear duct; vestibular sensory epithelium; More reference expression data
BioGPS	More reference expression data
Gene ontology
Molecular function	transporter activity; ATPase-coupled ion transmembrane transporter activity; proton transmembrane transporter activity; hydrolase activity; proton-transporting ATPase activity, rotational mechanism
Cellular component	integral component of membrane; proton-transporting V-type ATPase, V0 domain; phagocytic vesicle membrane; membrane; endosome membrane
Biological process	insulin receptor signaling pathway; transferrin transport; ion transport; vacuolar acidification; ion transmembrane transport; regulation of macroautophagy; proton transmembrane transport; transmembrane transport; phagosome acidification
Sources:Amigo / QuickGO
Orthologs
Databases	NCBI: entry; OMA: entry
Species	Human	Mouse
Entrez	8992	11974
Ensembl	ENSG00000113732	ENSMUSG00000015575
UniProt	O15342	Q9CQD8
RefSeq (mRNA)	NM_003945	NM_025272
RefSeq (protein)	NP_003936	NP_079548
Location (UCSC)	Chr 5: 172.98 – 173.04 Mb	Chr 17: 26.88 – 26.92 Mb
PubMed search
- Wikidata
View/Edit Human	View/Edit Mouse

V-type proton ATPase subunit e 1 is an enzyme that in humans is encoded by the ATP6V0E1 gene.

This gene encodes a component of vacuolar ATPase (V-ATPase), a multisubunit enzyme that mediates acidification of eukaryotic intracellular organelles. V-ATPase dependent organelle acidification is necessary for such intracellular processes as protein sorting, zymogen activation, receptor-mediated endocytosis, and synaptic vesicle proton gradient generation. V-ATPase is composed of a cytosolic V1 domain and a transmembrane V0 domain. The V1 domain consists of three A and three B subunits, two G subunits plus the C, D, E, F, and H subunits. The V1 domain contains the ATP catalytic site. The V0 domain consists of five different subunits: a, c, c', c", and d. Additional isoforms of many of the V1 and V0 subunit proteins are encoded by multiple genes or alternatively spliced transcript variants. This encoded protein is possibly part of the V0 subunit. Since two nontranscribed pseudogenes have been found in dogs, it is possible that the localization to chromosome 2 for this gene by radiation hybrid mapping is representing a pseudogene. Genomic mapping puts the chromosomal location on 5q35.3.
