= ATP6AP1 =

Protein-coding gene in humans

Identifiers
- Aliases: ATP6AP1, 16A, ATP6IP1, ATP6S1, Ac45, CF2, VATPS1, XAP-3, XAP3, ATPase H+ transporting accessory protein 1
- External IDs: OMIM: 300197; MGI: 109629; GeneCards: ATP6AP1

Gene location (Human)
Chr.	X chromosome (human)
Band	Xq28	Start	154,428,633 bp
Band	Xq28	End	154,436,516 bp

Gene location (Mouse)
Chr.	X chromosome (mouse)
Band	X A7.3|X 37.96 cM	Start	73,340,703 bp
Band	X A7.3|X 37.96 cM	End	73,348,327 bp
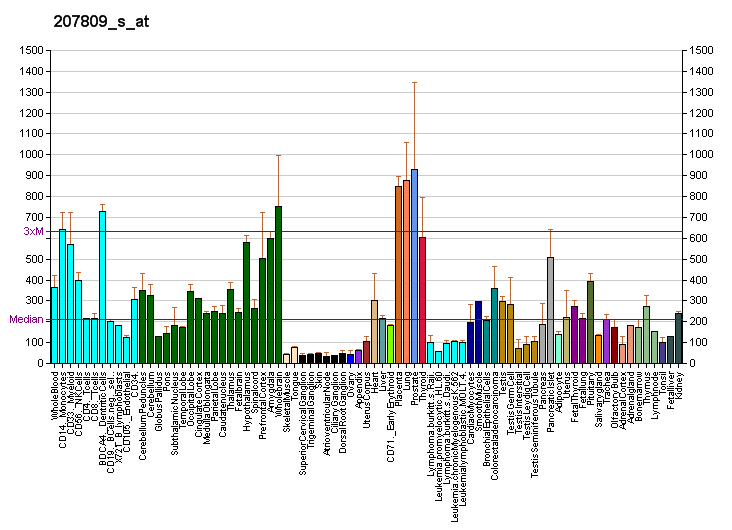
RNA expression pattern
Bgee	Human / Mouse (ortholog); Top expressed in: Brodmann area 10; paraflocculus of cerebellum; islet of Langerhans; stromal cell of endometrium; right hemisphere of cerebellum; right frontal lobe; anterior pituitary; frontal pole; middle frontal gyrus; cingulate gyrus / Top expressed in: stroma of bone marrow; dentate gyrus of hippocampal formation granule cell; superior frontal gyrus; primary visual cortex; calvaria; granulocyte; epithelium of stomach; cerebellar cortex; anterior horn of spinal cord; hippocampus proper; More reference expression data
BioGPS	More reference expression data
Gene ontology
Molecular function	nucleotide binding; proton-transporting ATP synthase activity, rotational mechanism; transporter activity; proton-transporting ATPase activity, rotational mechanism; ATP binding
Cellular component	integral component of membrane; proton-transporting V-type ATPase, V1 domain; membrane; proton-transporting two-sector ATPase complex; endosome membrane; extracellular exosome; endoplasmic reticulum; endoplasmic reticulum membrane; endoplasmic reticulum-Golgi intermediate compartment membrane; plasma membrane proton-transporting V-type ATPase complex
Biological process	insulin receptor signaling pathway; transferrin transport; pH reduction; ion transport; positive regulation of bone resorption; positive regulation of osteoclast development; establishment of organelle localization; ion transmembrane transport; positive regulation of osteoblast differentiation; positive regulation of ERK1 and ERK2 cascade; positive regulation of exocytosis; cellular iron ion homeostasis; cellular response to increased oxygen levels; transport; regulation of cellular pH; proton transmembrane transport
Sources:Amigo / QuickGO
Orthologs
Databases	NCBI: entry; OMA: entry
Species	Human	Mouse
Entrez	537	54411
Ensembl	ENSG00000071553	ENSMUSG00000019087
UniProt	Q15904	Q9R1Q9
RefSeq (mRNA)	NM_001183	NM_018794; NM_001358375; NM_001358380
RefSeq (protein)	NP_001174	NP_061264; NP_001345304; NP_001345309
Location (UCSC)	Chr X: 154.43 – 154.44 Mb	Chr X: 73.34 – 73.35 Mb
PubMed search
- Wikidata
View/Edit Human	View/Edit Mouse

The human gene ATP6AP1 encodes the S1 subunit of the enzyme V-type proton ATPase.

This gene encodes a component of a multisubunit enzyme (1 mDa MW) that mediates acidification of eukaryotic intracellular organelles. Vacuolar ATPase (V-ATPase) is composed of a cytosolic, V_{1}, (site of the ATP catalytic site) and a transmembrane, V_{0}, domain. V-ATPase dependent organelle acidification is necessary for such intracellular processes as protein sorting, zymogen activation, and receptor-mediated endocytosis. The encoded protein of this gene is approximately 45 kD and may assist in the V-ATPase-mediated acidification of neuroendocrine secretory granules.
