= ATP6V1H =

Protein-coding gene in the species Homo sapiens

Identifiers
- Aliases: ATP6V1H, MSTP042, NBP1, SFD, SFDalpha, SFDbeta, VMA13, CGI-11, ATPase H+ transporting V1 subunit H
- External IDs: OMIM: 608861; MGI: 1914864; GeneCards: ATP6V1H

Gene location (Human)
Chr.	Chromosome 8 (human)
Band	8q11.23	Start	53,715,543 bp
Band	8q11.23	End	53,843,558 bp

Gene location (Mouse)
Chr.	Chromosome 1 (mouse)
Band	1|1 A1	Start	5,070,018 bp
Band	1|1 A1	End	5,162,529 bp
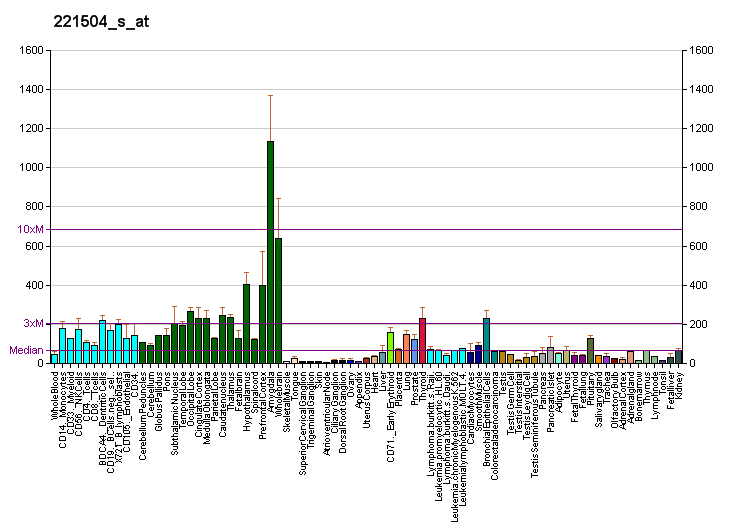
RNA expression pattern
Bgee	Human / Mouse (ortholog); Top expressed in: middle temporal gyrus; Brodmann area 9; prefrontal cortex; right frontal lobe; amygdala; nucleus accumbens; caudate nucleus; cingulate gyrus; hippocampus proper; anterior cingulate cortex / Top expressed in: stroma of bone marrow; anterior horn of spinal cord; right kidney; dentate gyrus of hippocampal formation granule cell; spermatocyte; facial motor nucleus; superior cervical ganglion; amygdala; cingulate gyrus; medial vestibular nucleus; More reference expression data
BioGPS	More reference expression data
Gene ontology
Molecular function	enzyme regulator activity; ATPase activity; protein binding; proton-transporting ATPase activity, rotational mechanism
Cellular component	cytosol; plasma membrane; lysosomal membrane; extracellular exosome; vacuolar proton-transporting V-type ATPase, V1 domain
Biological process	insulin receptor signaling pathway; endocytosis; transferrin transport; mitigation of host defenses by virus; ion transport; ion transmembrane transport; regulation of macroautophagy; phagosome acidification; regulation of catalytic activity; viral process; vacuolar acidification; transport
Sources:Amigo / QuickGO
Orthologs
Databases	NCBI: entry; OMA: entry
Species	Human	Mouse
Entrez	51606	108664
Ensembl	ENSG00000047249	ENSMUSG00000033793
UniProt	Q9UI12	Q8BVE3
RefSeq (mRNA)	NM_015941; NM_213619; NM_213620	NM_133826; NM_001310442
RefSeq (protein)	NP_057025; NP_998784; NP_998785; NP_998784.1	NP_001297371; NP_598587
Location (UCSC)	Chr 8: 53.72 – 53.84 Mb	Chr 1: 5.07 – 5.16 Mb
PubMed search
- Wikidata
View/Edit Human	View/Edit Mouse

V-type proton ATPase subunit H is an enzyme that in humans is encoded by the ATP6V1H gene.

== Function ==
This gene encodes a component of vacuolar ATPase (V-ATPase), a multisubunit enzyme that mediates acidification of eukaryotic intracellular organelles. V-ATPase dependent organelle acidification is necessary for such intracellular processes as protein sorting, zymogen activation, receptor-mediated endocytosis, and synaptic vesicle proton gradient generation. V-ATPase is composed of a cytosolic V1 domain and a transmembrane V0 domain. The V1 domain consists of three A and three B subunits, two G subunits plus the C, D, E, F, and H subunits. The V1 domain contains the ATP catalytic site. The V0 domain consists of five different subunits: a, c, c', c", and d. Additional isoforms of many of the V1 and V0 subunit proteins are encoded by multiple genes or alternatively spliced transcript variants. This gene encodes the regulatory H subunit of the V1 domain which is required for catalysis of ATP but not the assembly of V-ATPase. Three alternatively spliced transcript variants encode two isoforms of the H subunit.
