= ATP6V1A =

Protein-coding gene in the species Homo sapiens

Identifiers
- Aliases: ATP6V1A, ATP6A1, ATP6V1A1, HO68, VA68, VPP2, Vma1, ATPase H+ transporting V1 subunit A, ARCL2D, IECEE3, DEE93
- External IDs: OMIM: 607027; MGI: 1201780; GeneCards: ATP6V1A
Enzyme activity
EC #	BRENDA	ExPASy	KEGG	MetaCyc
7.1.2.2	↗	↗	↗	↗

Gene location (Human)
Chr.	Chromosome 3 (human)
Band	3q13.31	Start	113,747,033 bp
Band	3q13.31	End	113,812,056 bp

Gene location (Mouse)
Chr.	Chromosome 16 (mouse)
Band	16|16 B4	Start	43,905,765 bp
Band	16|16 B4	End	43,960,068 bp
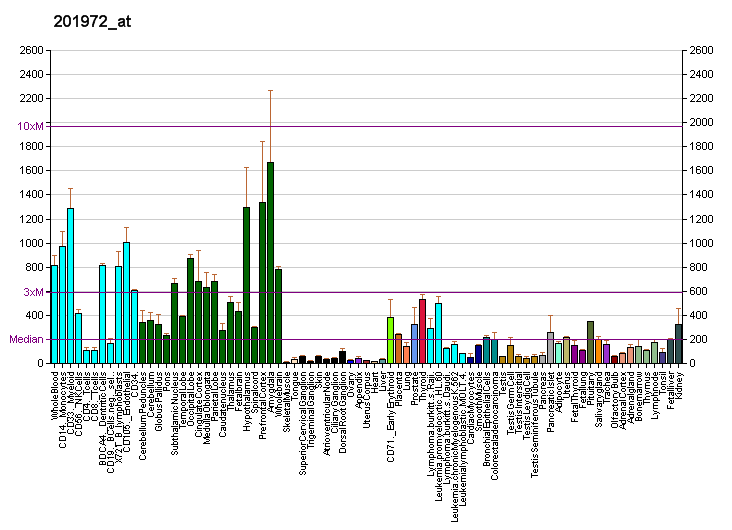

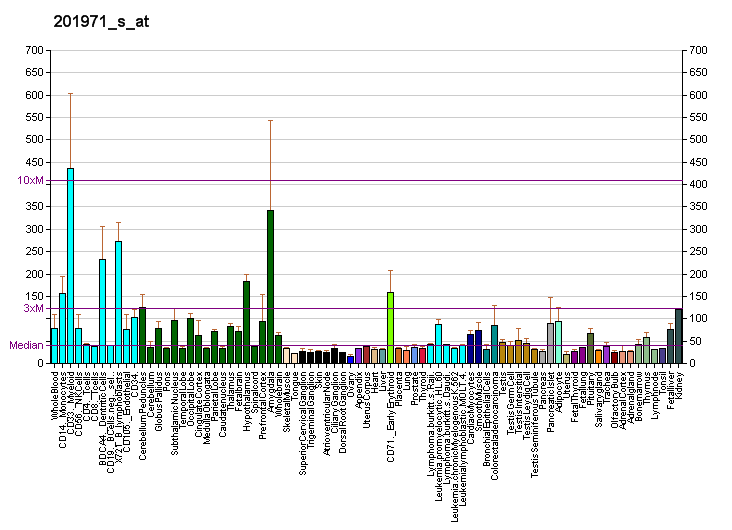
RNA expression pattern
Bgee	Human / Mouse (ortholog); Top expressed in: Brodmann area 23; middle temporal gyrus; pons; endothelial cell; Epithelium of choroid plexus; kidney tubule; orbitofrontal cortex; cerebellar vermis; lateral nuclear group of thalamus; renal medulla / Top expressed in: cingulate gyrus; ventromedial nucleus; CA3 field; primary motor cortex; dentate gyrus; facial motor nucleus; medial dorsal nucleus; medial vestibular nucleus; pontine nuclei; anterior amygdaloid area; More reference expression data
BioGPS	More reference expression data
Gene ontology
Molecular function	nucleotide binding; hydrolase activity; ATP binding; proton-transporting ATPase activity, rotational mechanism
Cellular component	proton-transporting V-type ATPase, V1 domain; cytosol; myelin sheath; plasma membrane; proton-transporting two-sector ATPase complex; integral component of plasma membrane; microvillus; lysosomal membrane; apical plasma membrane; mitochondrion; extracellular exosome; cytoplasm; vacuolar membrane
Biological process	insulin receptor signaling pathway; transferrin transport; ion transport; ion transmembrane transport; ATP metabolic process; regulation of macroautophagy; phagosome acidification; cellular iron ion homeostasis; cellular response to increased oxygen levels; transport; proton transmembrane transport
Sources:Amigo / QuickGO
Orthologs
Databases	NCBI: entry; OMA: entry
Species	Human	Mouse
Entrez	523	11964
Ensembl	ENSG00000114573	ENSMUSG00000052459
UniProt	P38606	P50516
RefSeq (mRNA)	NM_001690	NM_007508; NM_001358203; NM_001358204
RefSeq (protein)	NP_001681	NP_031534; NP_001345132; NP_001345133
Location (UCSC)	Chr 3: 113.75 – 113.81 Mb	Chr 16: 43.91 – 43.96 Mb
PubMed search
- Wikidata
View/Edit Human	View/Edit Mouse

V-type proton ATPase catalytic subunit A is an enzyme that in humans is encoded by the ATP6V1A gene.

This gene encodes a component of vacuolar ATPase (V-ATPase), a multisubunit enzyme that mediates acidification of eukaryotic intracellular organelles. V-ATPase dependent organelle acidification is necessary for such intracellular processes as protein sorting, zymogen activation, receptor-mediated endocytosis, and synaptic vesicle proton gradient generation. V-ATPase is composed of a cytosolic V1 domain and a transmembrane V0 domain. The V1 domain consists of three A and three B subunits, two G subunits plus the C, D, E, F, and H subunits. The V1 domain contains the ATP catalytic site. The V0 domain consists of five different subunits: a, c, c', c", and d. Additional isoforms of many of the V1 and V0 subunit proteins are encoded by multiple genes or alternatively spliced transcript variants. This encoded protein is one of two V1 domain A subunit isoforms and is found in all tissues. Transcript variants derived from alternative polyadenylation exist.
