= Berliet GR/TR =

Heavy French truck

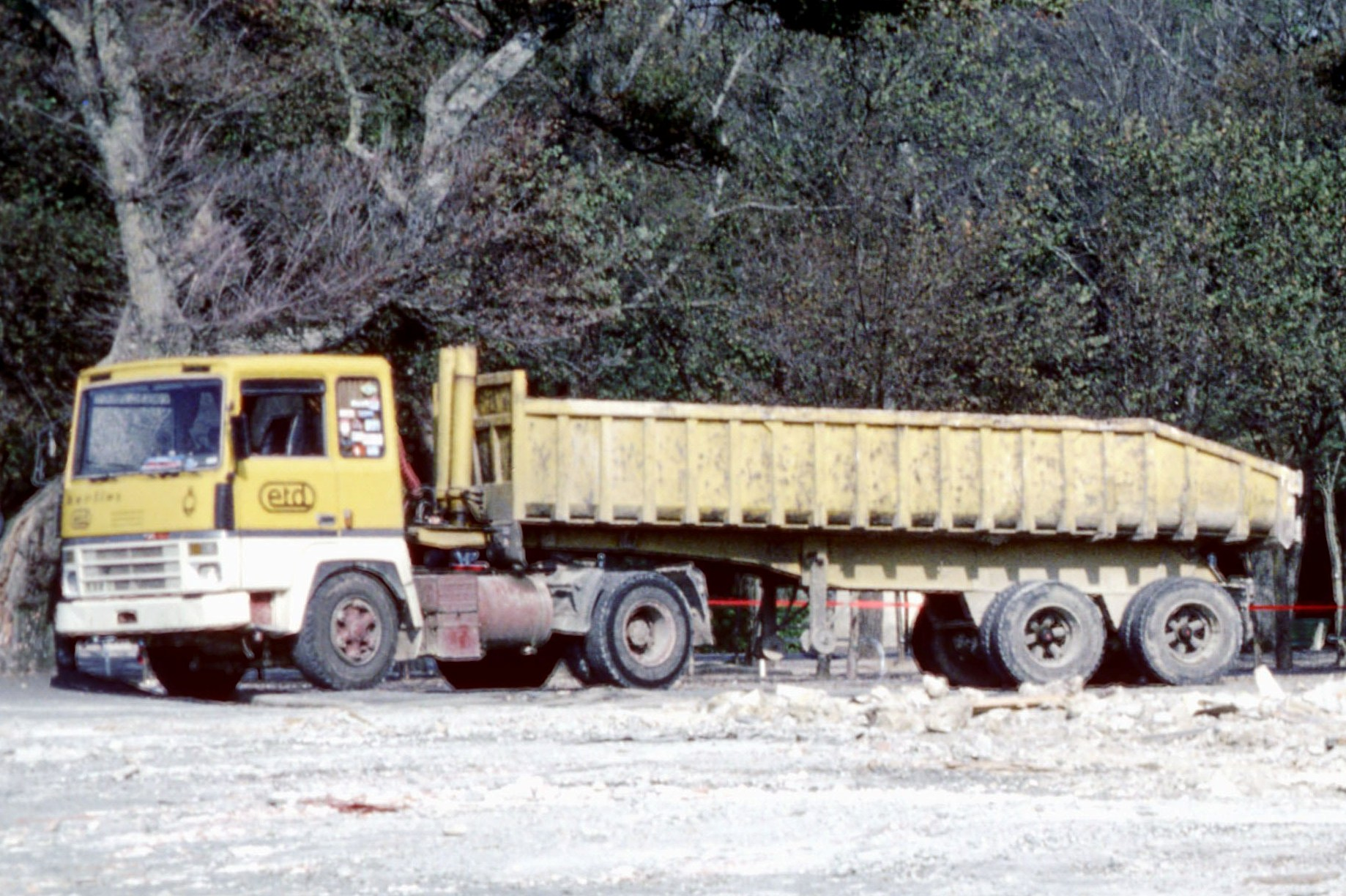
- Berliet TR 4×2 (tractor)

Overview
- Manufacturer: Berliet
- Also called: Berliet GF/TF; Berliet GRK/TRK; Saviem PX
- Production: 1961-1980

Body and chassis
- Class: Heavy truck
- Body style: COE
- Related: Ford Transcontinental

Powertrain
- Engine: diesel: 9.5 L M 620P/Z/T I6; 12.0 L M 635/MS/MDR/MDS 635.40 I6; 12.8 L V 825 V8; 14.9 L V 835 V8

Dimensions
- Wheelbase: 3.8–5.8 m (12.5–19.0 ft)
- Length: 7.2–10.55 m (23.6–34.6 ft)
- Width: 2.49 m (8.2 ft)
- Height: 3 m (9.8 ft)
- Kerb weight: 6,000–6,830 kg (13,230–15,060 lb)

Chronology
- Predecessor: Berliet GCK
- Successor: Renault R-series

The Berliet GR (rigid truck) and TR (tractor truck) were a family of heavy trucks manufactured by Berliet in two generations; the original design was first introduced in 1961 (GRK10, using the 1957 Relaxe cabin design), and the second generation, using the all-new square KB 2400 cabin, was introduced at the 1970 Paris Salon. The Berliet (and Saviem) brands were retired in April 1980; the GR/TR was replaced by a facelifted version of the KB 2400 cab called the Renault R-series.

== Design ==
Berliet offered a range of straight-six diesel engines in the various models, with a 14.9-litre V8 added on the second generation. The initial models received model numbers indicating the displacement in litres, such as TR10 or GR12. From 1968, the model code indicated engine power instead, with the models becoming the GR/TR200 and GR/TR250, respectively, along with slight engine upgrades and incremental power increases.

The original cab was fixed, but the new KB 2400 cabin was a tilting design (basculante, hence the "B"). In the early 1960s, the lineup was only offered with a six-speed, single-range transmission, but in the 1970s, Berliet offered six different transmissions - including options from ZF and Fuller.

== First generation ==
Fitted with the 1957 Relaxe fixed cab, the first model in this series was the GRK10 (and TRK10 tractor) with a 19-tonne GVWR. The initial version had the gear shifter mounted on the dash and was fitted with a 9.5-litre diesel inline-six. This engine, the M 620Z, was built under a license from German MAN. The heavier 12.0-litre GR12 and TR12 (M 635 engine) were added in 1964. Maximum power outputs were listed in SAE by Berliet and were marginally higher than DIN ratings. The first 9.5-litre engine developed a claimed 180 hp (132 kW); after a 1968 update (M 620P), power increased to 192 hp (141 kW). The 12.0-litre engine initially produced 240 hp (177 kW) at 2,200 rpm – examples exported to Germany had identical specifications but were rated 228 PS DIN (168 kW). The updated version of this engine used in the GR/TR250 has a claimed 250 hp (184 kW). These post-1968 models were marketed as the GR/TR200 and 250, although they were still officially listed as the GR/TR10 and 12 with the Service des Mines.

There was also a lower-rated version of the GR10/TR10 with a maximum load of 10 tonnes, intended for European export markets where the weight limit was lower than in France. These models were called the GF12/TF12; only thirty examples were built. Berliet consistently lobbied the French government to retain the more permissive 13-tonne limit to protect its market share from import competition. Models on a 6×4 chassis were denoted by a trailing letter "H" (GRH/TRH). Certain models from the first generation, such as the TR250, were kept in production alongside the next generation until 1973.

== Second generation ==
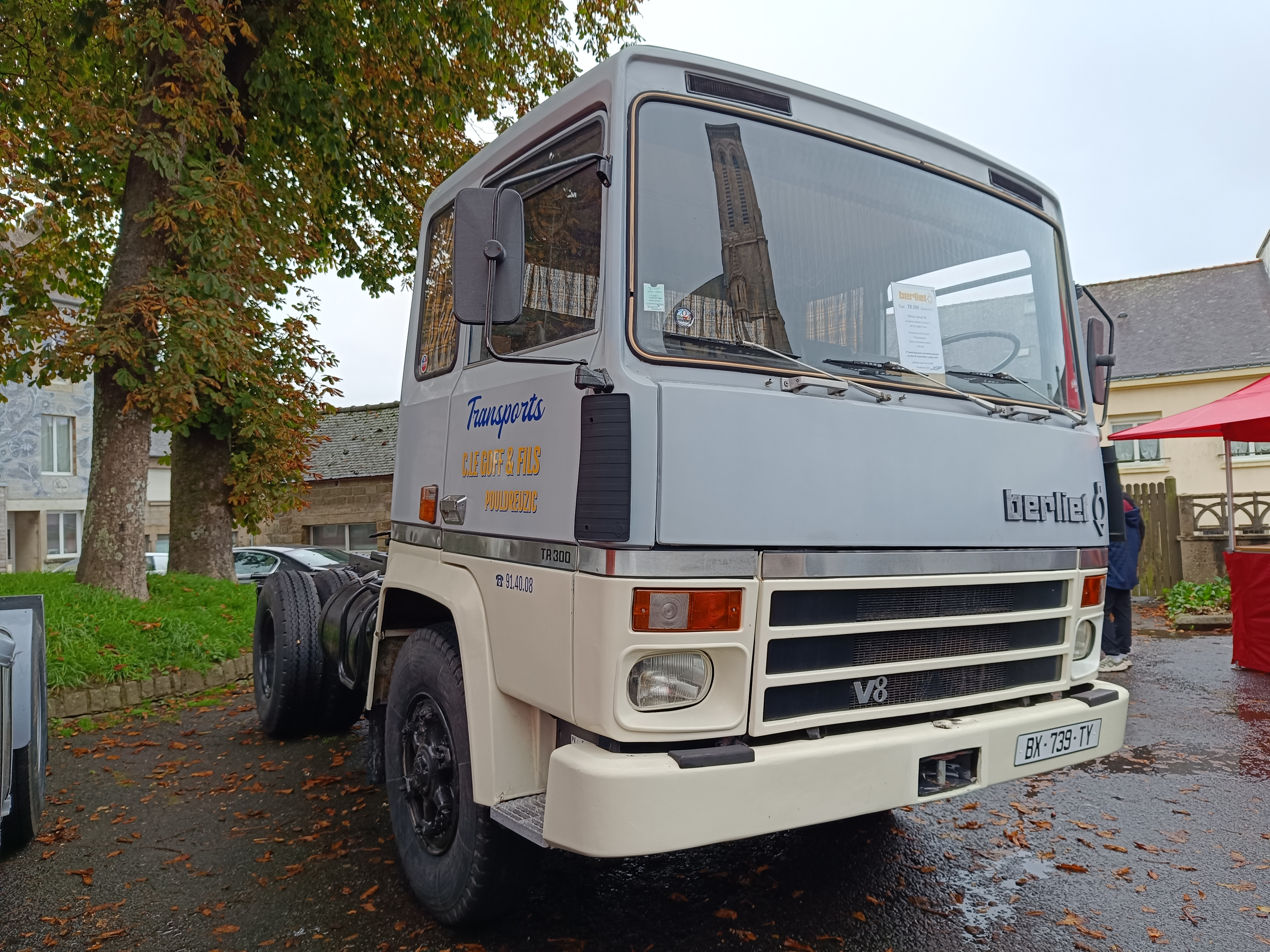
Berliet TR300 (initial model)

The new GR/TR300 model premiered at the 1970 Paris Motor Show, with an angular, modern design by Louis Lucien Lepoix. The truck, however, had a somewhat rushed development, and the initial model proved unreliable. Berliet replaced this with the re-engineered GR/TR320 in late 1972 and a realignment of the lineup in 1973, adding an entire range of new models from the GR205 to the GR320 – just in time for the oil crisis. A second facelift in 1975 brought the headlamps down, out of the grille into the bumper, and a revised interior. This cabin was also used by Ford for their 1975 Transcontinental and was taken over by Renault in 1980 for their R-series.

The lower-weight models used the old inline-six diesel, with or without a turbocharger. The TR205 (introduced in 1973) used the 195 PS (143 kW) M 620T engine, with the 12.0-litre being fitted to the TR260 (TR280 when turbocharged). The first model was the powerful but fragile 12.8-litre, V8-engined TR300, producing 300 PS SAE (221 kW) at 2,500 rpm and 940 N⋅m (693 lb⋅ft) at 1,600 rpm. This model damaged Berliet's reputation and had significant warranty costs; besides the engine, there were also transmission problems and broken rear axles. Only 778 examples were built, and it was replaced in July 1972 (after less than two years) by the 14.9-litre GR/TR320, a much more reliable and lower-stressed engine; power went up marginally to 310 PS SAE (228 kW). In late 1977, a new model was added below the V8-engined versions: the turbocharged, six-cylinder GR/TR305 (MDR 635) - this has the same maximum power as the old GR/TR300, but with significantly higher torque: 1,255 N⋅m (926 lb⋅ft) at 1,400 rpm. In late 1979, this engine received Renault's fuel injection system and became the MIDR 635; power and torque increased to 306 PS (225 kW) and 1,270 N⋅m (937 lb⋅ft).

To compete with the recently introduced Volvo Globetrotter, Berliet released a luxurious version of the GR/TR called the Centaure. Converted to order by coachbuilders Lamberet and introduced at the 1978 Paris Salon, it featured a fibreglass raised roof, custom paint, and ample chrome, including the smokestacks. The interior featured a kitchenette, external shower, WC, sleeping compartment, air conditioning, and custom finishes.

=== TR280D ===
Berliet's exports were mainly to their old colonies in North Africa, limited in part by the fact that the permitted load per axle was higher in France than anywhere else in Europe. To be able to target some export markets, a version called the TR280D was developed, with a 10 t (22,000 lb) axle load. Introduced in 1974, only about 300 examples were built, with most of them sold in Belgium and the Netherlands. Berliet largely stayed out of markets with strong indigenous truck manufacturers, while the Italian and UK markets required right-hand drive. The Swiss market had a 2.3 m (91 in) width limit. A right-hand drive model was eventually developed for Italy. However, mountainous Italy also required a minimum of 8 horsepower per ton – the TR280D's maximum power of 211 PS DIN (155 kW) limited it to 26 t (57,300 lb), rendering it totally uncompetitive, and only a handful were sold.

=== Saviem PX ===
From late 1978 or early 1979 until April 1980, when Saviem and Berliet were merged into Renault Véhicules Industriels (RVI), the GR/TR was also sold with Saviem badging. Three models were available: the PX 28 corresponded to the GR/TR280 (a trailing "T" indicated a tractor), the PX 30 corresponded to the GR/TR305, and the PX 40 corresponded to the V8-engined GR/TR350 with 356 PS (262 kW). The only difference was the arrangement of the logos in the grille, which also included a large Renault logo on the Saviem.
