= Bacterial potassium transporter =

TrkH
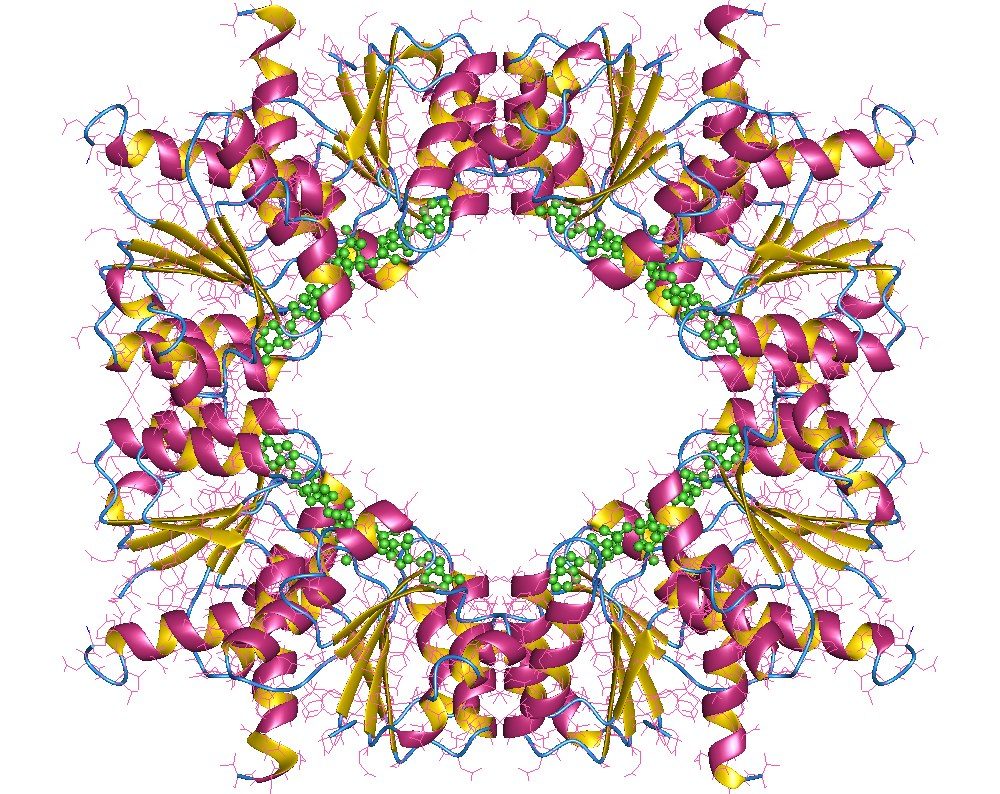
- Potassium transporter oktamer, Bacillus subtilis

Identifiers
- Symbol: TrkH
- Pfam: PF02386
- Pfam clan: CL0030
- InterPro: IPR003445
- TCDB: 2.A.38
- OPM superfamily: 8
- OPM protein: 3pjz
Available protein structures:
- PDB: IPR003445 PF02386 (ECOD; PDBsum)
- AlphaFold: IPR003445; PF02386

This protein family consists of various potassium transport proteins (Trk) and V-type sodium ATP synthase subunit J or translocating ATPase J (EC). These proteins are involved in active sodium uptake utilizing ATP in the process. TrkH from Escherichia coli is a transmembrane protein and determines the specificity and kinetics of cation transport by the TrK system in this organism. This protein interacts with TrkA and requires TrkE for transport activity.
