= ATCase/OTCase family =

Aspartate/ornithine carbamoyltransferase, carbamoyl-P binding domain
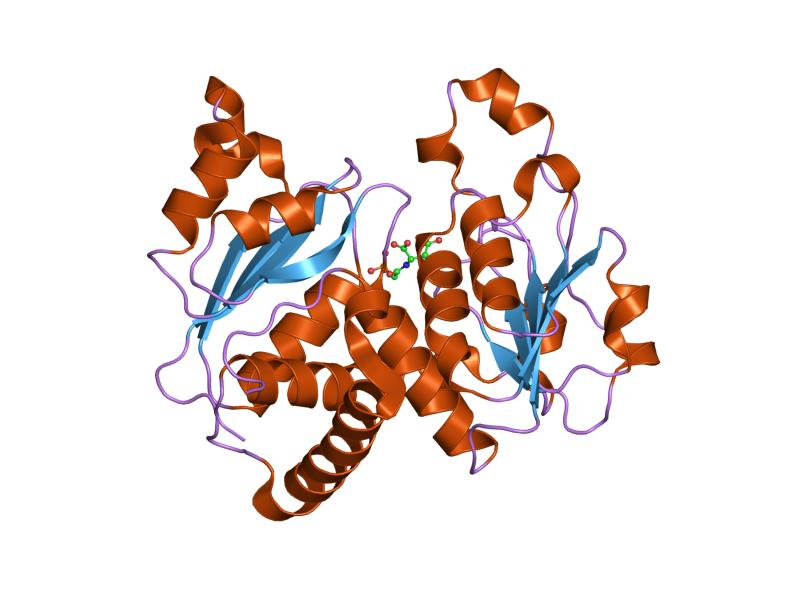
- the pala-liganded aspartate transcarbamoylase catalytic subunit from pyrococcus abyssi

Identifiers
- Symbol: OTCace_N
- Pfam: PF02729
- InterPro: IPR006132
- PROSITE: PDOC00091
- SCOP2: 1raa / SCOPe / SUPFAM
Available protein structures:
- PDB: IPR006132 PF02729 (ECOD; PDBsum)
- AlphaFold: IPR006132; PF02729

Aspartate/ornithine carbamoyltransferase, Asp/Orn binding domain

Identifiers
- Symbol: OTCace
- Pfam: PF00185
- SCOP2: 1raa / SCOPe / SUPFAM
Available protein structures:
- PDB: PF00185 (ECOD; PDBsum)
- AlphaFold: PF00185

In molecular biology, the ATCase/OTCase family is a protein family which contains two related enzymes: aspartate carbamoyltransferase EC 2.1.3.2 and ornithine carbamoyltransferase EC 2.1.3.3. It has been shown that these enzymes are evolutionary related. The predicted secondary structure of both enzymes is similar and there are some regions of sequence similarities. One of these regions includes three residues which have been shown, by crystallographic studies to be implicated in binding the phosphoryl group of carbamoyl phosphate and may also play a role in trimerisation of the molecules. The N-terminal domain is the carbamoyl phosphate binding domain. The C-terminal domain is an aspartate/ornithine-binding domain.

Aspartate carbamoyltransferase (ATCase) catalyses the conversion of aspartate and carbamoyl phosphate to carbamoylaspartate, the second step in the de novo biosynthesis of pyrimidine nucleotides. In prokaryotes ATCase consists of two subunits: a catalytic chain (gene pyrB) and a regulatory chain (gene pyrI), while in eukaryotes it is a domain in a multi- functional enzyme (called URA2 in yeast, rudimentary in Drosophila, and CAD in mammals) that also catalyzes other steps of the biosynthesis of pyrimidines.

Ornithine carbamoyltransferase (OTCase) catalyses the conversion of ornithine and carbamoyl phosphate to citrulline. In mammals this enzyme participates in the urea cycle and is located in the mitochondrial matrix. In prokaryotes and eukaryotic microorganisms it is involved in the biosynthesis of arginine. In some bacterial species it is also involved in the degradation of arginine (the arginine deaminase pathway).
