= ATP6V0D1 =

Protein-coding gene in the species Homo sapiens

Identifiers
- Aliases: ATP6V0D1, ATP6D, ATP6DV, P39, VATX, VMA6, VPATPD, ATPase H+ transporting V0 subunit d1
- External IDs: OMIM: 607028; MGI: 1201778; GeneCards: ATP6V0D1

Gene location (Human)
Chr.	Chromosome 16 (human)
Band	16q22.1	Start	67,438,014 bp
Band	16q22.1	End	67,481,181 bp

Gene location (Mouse)
Chr.	Chromosome 8 (mouse)
Band	8|8 D3	Start	106,251,097 bp
Band	8|8 D3	End	106,292,679 bp
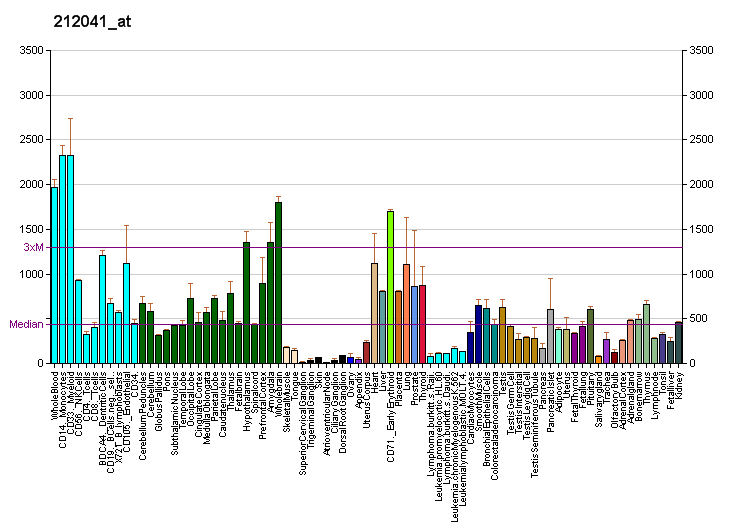
RNA expression pattern
Bgee	Human / Mouse (ortholog); Top expressed in: mucosa of transverse colon; beta cell; lateral nuclear group of thalamus; granulocyte; mononuclear cell; monocyte; pars compacta; prefrontal cortex; right frontal lobe; lower lobe of lung / Top expressed in: facial motor nucleus; anterior horn of spinal cord; stroma of bone marrow; hippocampus proper; superior frontal gyrus; epithelium of lens; central gray substance of midbrain; subiculum; temporal lobe; primary motor cortex; More reference expression data
BioGPS	More reference expression data
Gene ontology
Molecular function	protein-containing complex binding; protein binding; proton transmembrane transporter activity; P-type proton-exporting transporter activity; proton-transporting ATPase activity, rotational mechanism
Cellular component	axon terminus; proton-transporting V-type ATPase, V0 domain; phagocytic vesicle membrane; centrosome; membrane; synaptic vesicle; lysosomal membrane; apical plasma membrane; neuron projection; vacuolar proton-transporting V-type ATPase complex; endosome membrane; extracellular exosome; early endosome; protein-containing complex; plasma membrane proton-transporting V-type ATPase complex
Biological process	insulin receptor signaling pathway; transferrin transport; ion transport; ion transmembrane transport; IRE1-mediated unfolded protein response; brain development; cell projection organization; regulation of macroautophagy; phagosome acidification; cilium assembly; vacuolar transport; vacuolar acidification; cellular iron ion homeostasis; cellular response to increased oxygen levels; transport; proton transmembrane transport
Sources:Amigo / QuickGO
Orthologs
Databases	NCBI: entry; OMA: entry
Species	Human	Mouse
Entrez	9114	11972
Ensembl	ENSG00000159720	ENSMUSG00000013160
UniProt	P61421	P51863
RefSeq (mRNA)	NM_004691	NM_013477
RefSeq (protein)	NP_004682	NP_038505
Location (UCSC)	Chr 16: 67.44 – 67.48 Mb	Chr 8: 106.25 – 106.29 Mb
PubMed search
- Wikidata
View/Edit Human	View/Edit Mouse

V-type proton ATPase subunit d 1 is an enzyme that in humans is encoded by the ATP6V0D1 gene.

This gene encodes a component of vacuolar ATPase (V-ATPase), a multisubunit enzyme that mediates acidification of eukaryotic intracellular organelles. V-ATPase dependent organelle acidification is necessary for such intracellular processes as protein sorting, zymogen activation, receptor-mediated endocytosis, and synaptic vesicle proton gradient generation. V-ATPase is composed of a cytosolic V1 domain and a transmembrane V0 domain. The V1 domain consists of three A and three B subunits, two G subunits plus the C, D, E, F, and H subunits. The V1 domain contains the ATP catalytic site. The V0 domain consists of five different subunits: a, c, c', c'', and d. Additional isoforms of many of the V1 and V0 subunit proteins are encoded by multiple genes or alternatively spliced transcript variants. This encoded protein is known as the D subunit and is found ubiquitously.
