= ATP6V0D2 =

Protein-coding gene in the species Homo sapiens

Identifiers
- Aliases: ATP6V0D2, ATPase, H+ transporting, lysosomal 38kDa, V0 subunit d2, ATP6D2, VMA6, ATPase H+ transporting V0 subunit d2
- External IDs: OMIM: 618072; MGI: 1924415; GeneCards: ATP6V0D2

Gene location (Human)
Chr.	Chromosome 8 (human)
Band	8q21.3	Start	85,987,323 bp
Band	8q21.3	End	86,154,225 bp

Gene location (Mouse)
Chr.	Chromosome 4 (mouse)
Band	4|4 A3	Start	19,876,841 bp
Band	4|4 A3	End	19,922,605 bp
RNA expression pattern
Bgee	Human / Mouse (ortholog); Top expressed in: human kidney; buccal mucosa cell; amniotic fluid; renal medulla; testicle; rectum; tibia; muscle of thigh; mucosa of transverse colon; skin of hip / Top expressed in: lumbar spinal ganglion; submandibular gland; body of femur; parotid gland; decidua; right kidney; calvaria; human kidney; right lung; right lung lobe; More reference expression data
BioGPS	n/a
Gene ontology
Molecular function	protein binding; proton transmembrane transporter activity; P-type proton-exporting transporter activity; proton-transporting ATPase activity, rotational mechanism
Cellular component	proton-transporting V-type ATPase, V0 domain; endosome; phagocytic vesicle membrane; membrane; apical plasma membrane; vacuolar proton-transporting V-type ATPase complex; endosome membrane; extracellular exosome; lysosomal membrane; early endosome; plasma membrane proton-transporting V-type ATPase complex
Biological process	insulin receptor signaling pathway; transferrin transport; ion transport; ion transmembrane transport; regulation of macroautophagy; phagosome acidification; vacuolar transport; vacuolar acidification; transport
Sources:Amigo / QuickGO
Orthologs
Databases	NCBI: entry; OMA: entry
Species	Human	Mouse
Entrez	245972	242341
Ensembl	ENSG00000147614	ENSMUSG00000028238
UniProt	Q8N8Y2	Q80SY3
RefSeq (mRNA)	NM_152565	NM_175406
RefSeq (protein)	NP_689778	NP_780615
Location (UCSC)	Chr 8: 85.99 – 86.15 Mb	Chr 4: 19.88 – 19.92 Mb
PubMed search
- Wikidata
View/Edit Human	View/Edit Mouse

ATPase, H+ transporting, lysosomal 38kDa, V0 subunit d2 is a protein in humans that is encoded by the ATP6V0D2 gene. It is part of proton pumps in the plasma membranes of osteoclasts and aids with extracellular acidification in bone resorption.
