= DHH phosphatase family =

DHH family
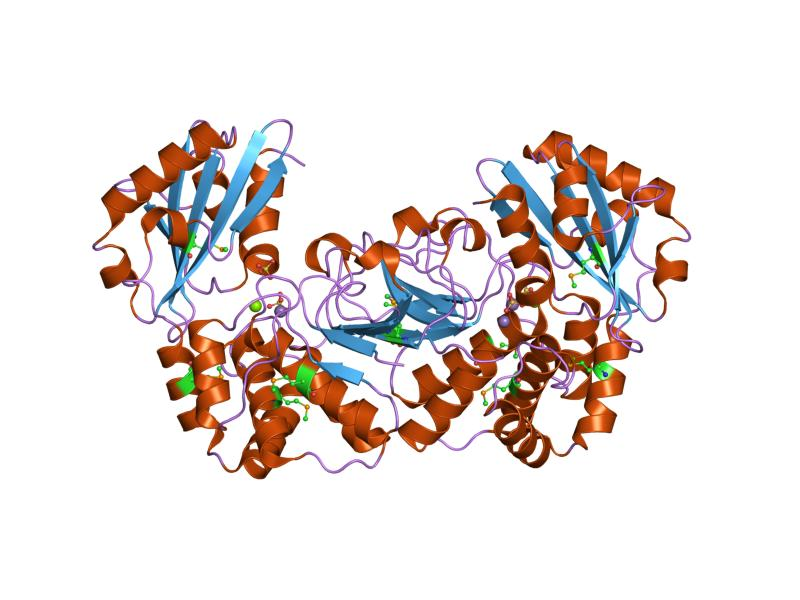
- streptococcus mutans inorganic pyrophosphatase

Identifiers
- Symbol: DHH
- Pfam: PF01368
- InterPro: IPR001667
- SCOP2: 1i74 / SCOPe / SUPFAM
Available protein structures:
- PDB: IPR001667 PF01368 (ECOD; PDBsum)
- AlphaFold: IPR001667; PF01368

In molecular biology, the DHH phosphatase family is a family of putative phosphoesterases. The family includes Drosophila prune protein and bacterial RecJ exonuclease. The RecJ protein of Escherichia coli plays an important role in a number of DNA repair and recombination pathways. RecJ catalyses processive degradation of single-stranded DNA in a 5'-to-3' direction. Sequences highly related to those encoding RecJ can be found in many of the eubacterial genomes sequenced to date.
