= Plant communication =

Biological communication by plants

Plants are exposed to many stress factors such as disease, temperature changes, herbivory, injury and more. Therefore, in order to respond or be ready for any kind of physiological state, they need to develop some sort of system for their survival in the moment and/or for the future. Plant communication encompasses communication using volatile organic compounds, electrical signaling, and common mycorrhizal networks between plants and a host of other organisms such as soil microbes, other plants (of the same or other species), animals, insects, and fungi.

Plants communicate through a host of volatile organic compounds (VOCs) that can be separated into four broad categories, each the product of distinct chemical pathways: fatty acid derivatives, phenylpropanoids/benzenoids, amino acid derivatives, and terpenoids. Due to the physical/chemical constraints most VOCs are of low molecular mass (< 300 Da), are hydrophobic, and have high vapor pressures. The responses of organisms to plant emitted VOCs varies from attracting the predator of a specific herbivore to reduce mechanical damage inflicted on the plant to the induction of chemical defenses of a neighboring plant before it is being attacked. In addition, the host of VOCs emitted varies from plant to plant, where for example, the Venus Fly Trap can emit VOCs to specifically target and attract starved prey.

While these VOCs typically lead to increased resistance to herbivory in neighboring plants, there is no clear benefit to the emitting plant in helping nearby plants. As such, whether neighboring plants have evolved the capability to "eavesdrop" or whether there is an unknown tradeoff occurring is subject to much scientific debate. As related to the aspect of meaning-making, the field is also identified as phytosemiotics.

== Volatile communication ==
In Runyon et al. 2006, the researchers demonstrate how the parasitic plant, Cuscuta pentagona (field dodder), uses VOCs to interact with various hosts and determine locations. Dodder seedlings show direct growth toward tomato plants (Lycopersicon esculentum) and, specifically, tomato plant volatile organic compounds. This was tested by growing a dodder weed seedling in a contained environment, connected to two different chambers. One chamber contained tomato VOCs while the other had artificial tomato plants. After 4 days of growth, the dodder weed seedling showed a significant growth towards the direction of the chamber with tomato VOC's. Their experiments also showed that the dodder weed seedlings could distinguish between wheat (Triticum aestivum) VOCs and tomato plant volatiles. As when one chamber was filled with each of the two different VOCs, dodder weeds grew towards tomato plants as one of the wheat VOC's is repellent. These findings show evidence that volatile organic compounds determine ecological interactions between plant species and show statistical significance that the dodder weed can distinguish between different plant species by sensing their VOCs.

Tomato plant to plant communication is further examined in Zebelo et al. 2012, which studies tomato plant response to herbivory. Upon herbivory by Spodoptera littoralis, tomato plants emit VOCs that are released into the atmosphere and induce responses in neighboring tomato plants. When the herbivory-induced VOCs bind to receptors on other nearby tomato plants, responses occur within seconds. The neighboring plants experience a rapid depolarization in cell potential and increase in cytosolic calcium. Plant receptors are most commonly found on plasma membranes as well as within the cytosol, endoplasmic reticulum, nucleus, and other cellular compartments. VOCs that bind to plant receptors often induce signal amplification by action of secondary messengers including calcium influx as seen in response to neighboring herbivory. These emitted volatiles were measured by GC-MS and the most notable were 2-hexenal and 3-hexenal acetate. It was found that depolarization increased with increasing green leaf volatile concentrations. These results indicate that tomato plants communicate with one another via airborne volatile cues, and when these VOC's are perceived by receptor plants, responses such as depolarization and calcium influx occur within seconds.

=== Terpenoids ===
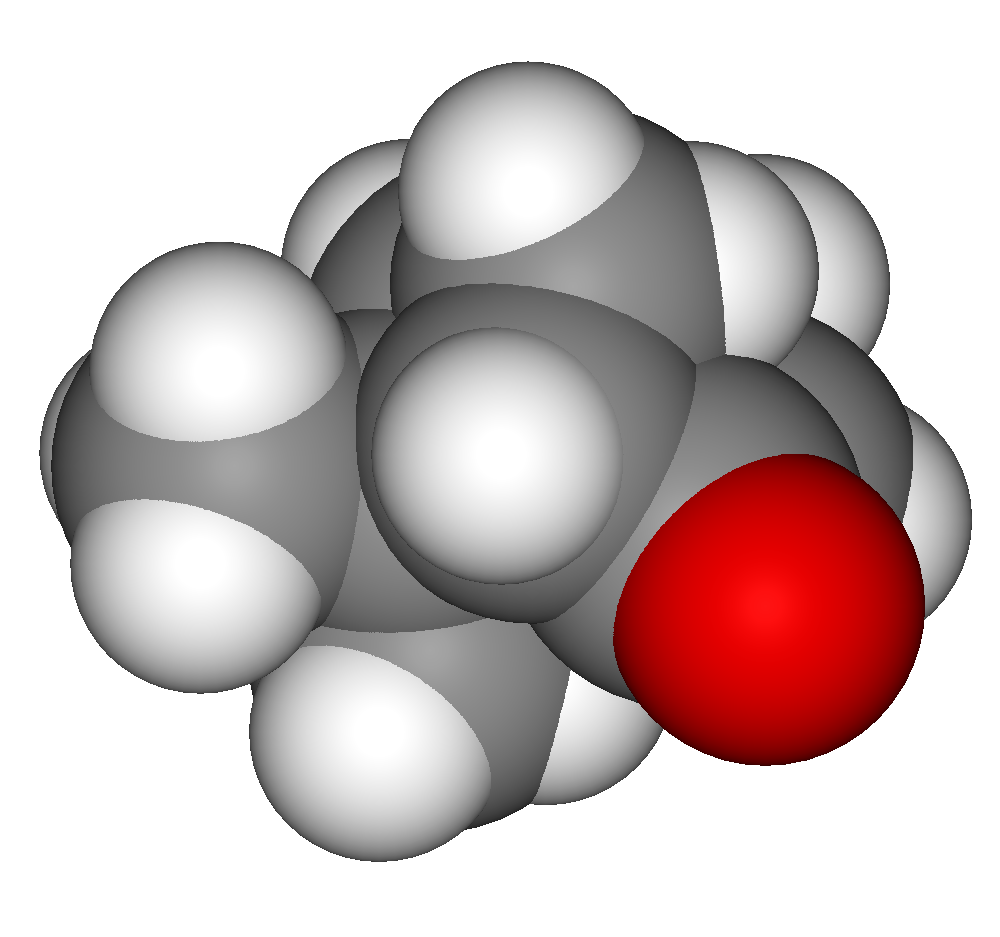
The terpenoid verbenone is a plant pheromone, signalling to insects that a tree is already infested by beetles.

Terpenoids facilitate communication between plants and insects, mammals, fungi, microorganisms, and other plants. Terpenoids may act as both attractants and repellants for various insects. For example, pine shoot beetles (Tomicus piniperda) are attracted to certain monoterpenes ( (+/-)-a-pinene, (+)-3-carene and terpinolene) produced by Scots pines (Pinus sylvestris), while being repelled by others (such as verbenone).

Terpenoids are a large family of biological molecules with over 22,000 compounds. Terpenoids are similar to terpenes in their carbon skeleton but unlike terpenes contain functional groups. The structure of terpenoids is described by the biogenetic isoprene rule which states that terpenoids can be thought of being made of isoprenoid subunits, arranged either regularly or irregularly. The biosynthesis of terpenoids occurs via the methylerythritol phosphate (MEP) and mevalonic acid (MVA) pathways both of which include isopentenyl diphosphate (IPP) and dimethylallyl diphosphate (DMAPP) as key components. The MEP pathway produces hemiterpenes, monoterpenes, diterpenes, and volatile carotenoid derivatives while the MVA pathway produces sesquiterpenes.

== Electrical signaling ==
Many researchers have shown that plants have the ability to use electrical signaling to communicate from leaves to stem to roots. Starting in the late 1800s scientists, such as Charles Darwin, examined ferns and Venus fly traps because they showed excitation patterns similar to animal nerves. However, the mechanisms behind this electrical signaling are not well known and are a current topic of ongoing research. A plant may produce electrical signaling in response to wounding, temperature extremes, high salt conditions, drought conditions, and other various stimuli.

There are two types of electrical signals that a plant uses. The first is the action potential and the second is the variation potential.

Similar to action potentials in animals, action potentials in plants are characterized as "all or nothing." This is the understood mechanism for how plant action potentials are initiated:

- A stimulus transitorily and reversibly activates calcium ion channels
- A short burst of calcium ions into the cell through the open calcium channels
- Calcium ions reversibly inactivate H+-ATPase activity
- Depolarization (due to calcium ion influx) activates voltage gated chloride channels causing chloride ions to leave the cell and cause further depolarization
- Calcium-ATPases decreases intracellular calcium concentration by pumping calcium ions to the outside of the cell (this allows for the H+-ATPase to be reactivated and repolarization to be initiated)
- Repolarization occurs when the activated H+-ATPase pumps H+ out of the cell and the open K+ channels allow for the flow of K+ to the outside of the cell

Plant resting membrane potentials range from -80 to -200 mV. High H+-ATPase activity corresponds with hyperpolarization (up to -200mV), making it harder to depolarize and fire an action potential. This is why it is essential for calcium ions to inactivate H+-ATPase activity so that depolarization can be reached. When the voltage gated chloride channels are activated and full depolarization occurs, calcium ions are pumped out of the cell (via a calcium-ATPase) after so that H+-ATPase activity resumes so that the cell can repolarize.

Calcium's interaction with the H+-ATPase is through a kinase. Therefore, calcium's influx causes the activation of a kinase that phosphorylates and deactivates the H+-ATPase so that the cell can depolarize. It is unclear whether all of the heightened calcium ion intracellular concentration is solely due to calcium channel activation. It is possible that the transitory activation of calcium channels causes an influx of calcium ions into the cell which activates intracellular stores of calcium ions to be released and subsequently causes depolarization (through the inactivation of H+-ATPase and activation of voltage gated chloride channels).

Variation potentials have proven hard to study and their mechanism is less well known than action potentials. Variation potentials are slower than action potentials, are not considered "all or nothing," and they themselves can trigger several action potentials. The current understanding is that upon wounding or other stressful events, a plant's turgor pressure changes which releases a hydraulic wave throughout the plant that is transmitted through the xylem. This hydraulic wave may activate pressure gated channels due to the sudden change in pressure. Their ionic mechanism is very different from action potentials and is thought to involve the inactivation of the P-type H+-ATPase.

Long distance electrical signaling in plants is characterized by electrical signaling that occurs over distances greater than the span of a single cell. In 1873, Sir John Burdon-Sanderson described action potentials and their long-distance propagation throughout plants. Action potentials in plants are carried out through a plants vascular network (particularly the phloem), a network of tissues that connects all of the various plant organs, transporting signaling molecules throughout the plant. Increasing the frequency of action potentials causes the phloem to become increasingly cross linked. In the phloem, the propagation of action potentials is dictated by the fluxes of chloride, potassium, and calcium ions, but the exact mechanism for propagation is not well understood. Alternatively, the transport of action potentials over short, local distances is distributed throughout the plant via plasmodesmatal connections between cells.

When a plant responds to stimuli, sometimes the response time is nearly instantaneous which is much faster than chemical signals are able to travel. Current research suggests that electrical signaling may be responsible. In particular, the response of a plant to a wound is triphasic. Phase 1 is an immediate great increase in expression of target genes. Phase 2 is a period of dormancy. Phase 3 is a weakened and delayed upregulation of the same target genes as phase 1. In phase 1, the speed of upregulation is nearly instantaneous which has led researchers to theorize that the initial response from a plant is through action potentials and variation potentials as opposed to chemical or hormonal signaling which is most likely responsible for the phase 3 response.

Upon stressful events, there is variation in a plant's response. That is to say, it is not always the case that a plant responds with an action potential or variation potential. However, when a plant does generate either an action potential or variation potential, one of the direct effects can be an upregulation of a certain gene's expression. In particular, protease inhibitors and calmodulin exhibit rapid upregulated gene expression. Additionally, ethylene has shown quick upregulation in the fruit of a plant as well as jasmonate in neighboring leaves to a wound. Aside from gene expression, action potentials and variation potentials also can result in stomatal and leaf movement.

In summary, electric signaling in plants is a powerful tool of communication and controls a plant's response to dangerous stimuli (like herbivory), helping to maintain homeostasis.

== Hydraulic signalling ==
2025 research has advanced understanding of how hydraulic pressure mediates long-distance signaling in plants. Scientists proposed a unified model showing that changes in negative pressure within plant vasculature transmit both mechanical and chemical stress signals. The study explained how pressure disturbances can trigger calcium fluxes and gene-expression responses, clarifying how plants coordinate whole-organism reactions to drought, wounding, and other stressors.

== Below-ground communication ==
=== Chemical Cues ===
Pisum sativum (garden pea) plants communicate stress cues via their roots to allow neighboring unstressed plants to anticipate an abiotic stressor. Pea plants are commonly grown in temperate regions throughout the world. However, this adaptation allows plants to anticipate abiotic stresses such as drought. In 2011, Falik et al. tested the ability of unstressed pea plants to sense and respond to stress cues by inducing osmotic stress on a neighboring plant. Falik et al. subjected the root of an externally-induced plant to mannitol in order to inflict osmotic stress and drought-like conditions. Five unstressed plants neighbored both sides of this stressed plant. On one side, the unstressed plants shared their root system with their neighbors to allow for root communication. On the other side, the unstressed plants did not share root systems with their neighbors.

Falik et al. found that unstressed plants demonstrated the ability to sense and respond to stress cues emitted from the roots of the osmotically stressed plant. Furthermore, the unstressed plants were able to send additional stress cues to other neighboring unstressed plants in order to relay the signal. A cascade effect of stomatal closure was observed in neighboring unstressed plants that shared their rooting system but was not observed in the unstressed plants that did not share their rooting system. Therefore, neighboring plants demonstrate the ability to sense, integrate, and respond to stress cues transmitted through roots. Although Falik et al. did not identify the chemical responsible for perceiving stress cues, research conducted in 2016 by Delory et al. suggests several possibilities. They found that plant roots synthesize and release a wide array of organic compounds including solutes and volatiles (i.e. terpenes). They cited additional research demonstrating that root-emitted molecules have the potential to induce physiological responses in neighboring plants either directly or indirectly by modifying the soil chemistry. Moreover, Kegge et al. demonstrated that plants perceive the presence of neighbors through changes in water/nutrient availability, root exudates, and soil microorganisms.

Although the underlying mechanism behind stress cues emitted by roots remains largely unknown, Falik et al. suggested that the plant hormone abscisic acid (ABA) may be responsible for integrating the observed phenotypic response (stomatal closure). Further research is needed to identify a well-defined mechanism and the potential adaptive implications for priming neighbors in preparation for forthcoming abiotic stresses; however, a literature review by Robbins et al. published in 2014 characterized the root endodermis as a signaling control center in response to abiotic environmental stresses including drought. They found that the plant hormone ABA regulates the root endodermal response under certain environmental conditions. In 2016 Rowe et al. experimentally validated this claim by showing that ABA regulated root growth under osmotic stress conditions. Additionally, changes in cytosolic calcium concentrations act as signals to close stomata in response to drought stress cues. Therefore, the flux of solutes, volatiles, hormones, and ions are likely involved in the integration of the response to stress cues emitted by roots.

=== Mycorrhizal networks ===
Another form of plant communication occurs through their root networks. Through roots, plants can share many different resources including carbon, nitrogen, and other nutrients. This transfer of below ground carbon is examined in Philip et al. 2011. The goals of this paper were to test if carbon transfer was bi-directional, if one species had a net gain in carbon, and if more carbon was transferred through the soil pathway or common mycorrhizal network (CMN). CMNs occur when fungal mycelia link roots of plants together. The researchers followed seedlings of paper birch and Douglas-fir in a greenhouse for 8 months, where hyphal linkages that crossed their roots were either severed or left intact. The experiment measured amounts of labeled carbon exchanged between seedlings. It was discovered that there was indeed a bi-directional sharing of carbon between the two tree species, with the Douglas-fir receiving a slight net gain in carbon. Also, the carbon was transferred through both soil and the CMN pathways, as transfer occurred when the CMN linkages were interrupted, but much more transfer occurred when the CMN's were left unbroken.

This experiment showed that through fungal mycelia linkage of the roots of two plants, plants are able to communicate with one another and transfer nutrients as well as other resources through below ground root networks. Further studies go on to argue that this underground "tree talk" is crucial in the adaptation of forest ecosystems. Plant genotypes have shown that mycorrhizal fungal traits are heritable and play a role in plant behavior. These relationships with fungal networks can be mutualistic, commensal, or even parasitic. It has been shown that plants can rapidly change behavior such as root growth, shoot growth, photosynthetic rate, and defense mechanisms in response to mycorrhizal colonization. Through root systems and common mycorrhizal networks, plants are able to communicate with one another below ground and alter behaviors or even share nutrients depending on different environmental cues.

== Acoustic communication ==
Studies have shown that plants can respond to airborne sounds at audible frequencies and that they also produce airborne sounds at the ultrasonic range, presumably audible to multiple organisms including bats, mice, moths and other insects. In 2025, collaborating researchers in the zoology and plant science departments of Tel Aviv University demonstrated that plants emit ultrasonic clicks which indicate the health of the plant. Moths hearing these clicks use them to select healthy plants upon which to lay eggs.

=== Communication in grasses ===
Many grasses release volatile signaling compounds when their tissues are damaged. Mechanical injury such as grazing or mowing causes the release of green leaf volatiles (GLVs), including compounds such as cis-3-hexenal and related molecules. These compounds contribute to the characteristic smell of freshly cut grass and function as chemical signals that can trigger defensive responses in nearby plants or attract predators of herbivorous insects.

The emission of GLVs following damage is considered part of a broader system of plant–plant signaling mediated by volatile organic compounds, which can influence ecological interactions within grasslands and other plant communities.

== See also ==
- Biosemiotics
- Phytosemiotics
- Plant defense against herbivory
- Plant intelligence
- Plant perception (physiology)
