= P3A =

P3A may refer to:

- P3a, a component of brain activity
- Public-Private Partnership Authority (Pakistan), an organization by the Government of Pakistan
- Plasma membrane H^{+}-ATPase (P3A ATPase), an enzyme
- Bowin P3a, a racing car
- P3A, a Canadian postcode assigned to Greater Sudbury
- P3A (Paphos Third Age), an affiliate of University of the Third Age
