= Hydrogen atpase =

Hydrogen ATPase commonly refers to:

- Hydrogen potassium ATPase, the gastric proton pump.
- Plasma membrane H+-ATPase
- V-ATPase, the synaptic vesicle transporter.

== See also ==
- Proton ATPase
