= Magnesium in biology =

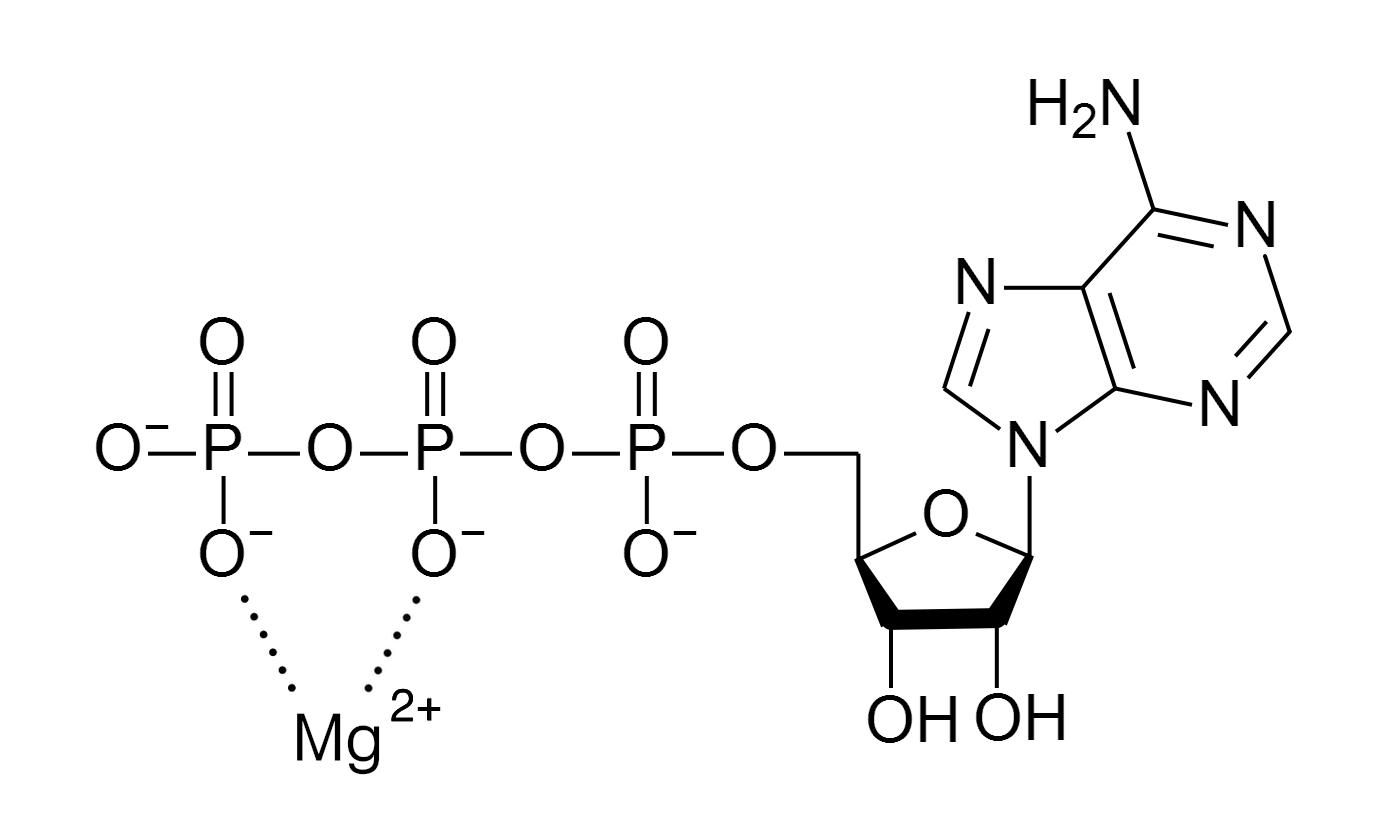
Magnesium–adenosine triphosphate ionic mixture, what is often just called adenosine triphosphate colloquially in biology

Magnesium is an essential element in biological systems. Magnesium occurs typically as the Mg^{2+} ion. It is an essential mineral nutrient (i.e., element) for life and is present in every cell type in every organism. For example, adenosine triphosphate (ATP), the main source of energy in cells, must bind to a magnesium ion in order to be biologically active. What is called ATP is often actually Mg-ATP. As such, magnesium plays a role in the stability of all polyphosphate compounds in the cells, including those associated with the synthesis of DNA and RNA.

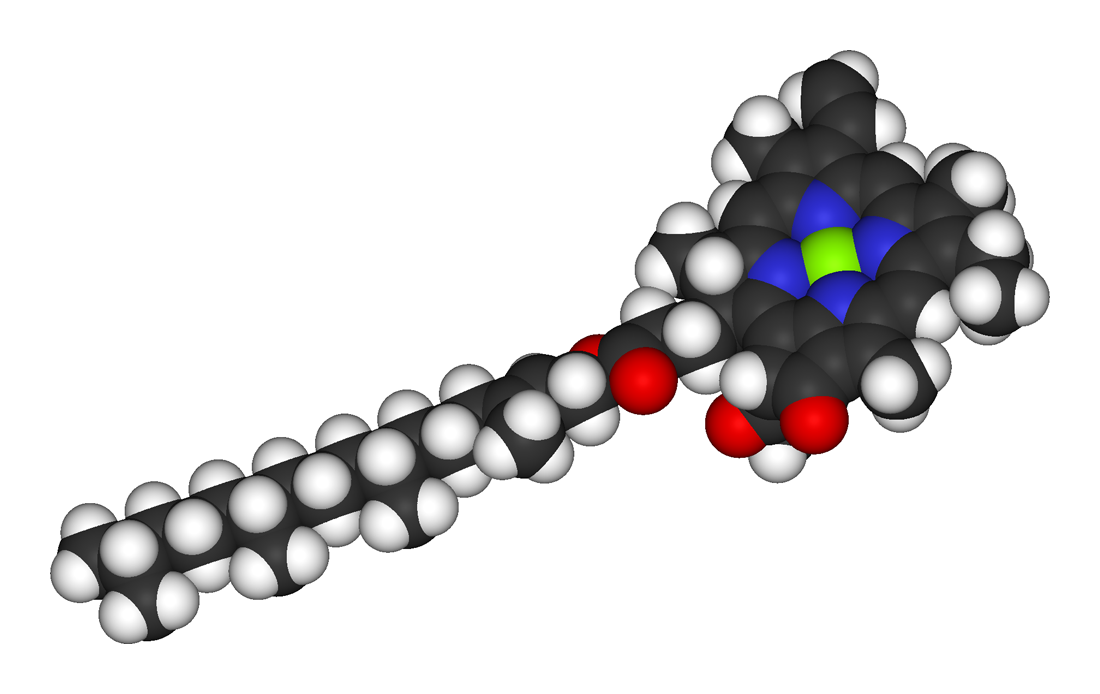
Space-filling model of the chlorophyll a molecule, with the magnesium ion (bright-green) visible at the center of the chlorin group

Over 300 enzymes require the presence of magnesium ions for their catalytic action, including all enzymes utilizing or synthesizing ATP, or those that use other nucleotides to synthesize DNA and RNA.

In plants, magnesium is necessary for synthesis of chlorophyll and photosynthesis.

== Function ==
A balance of magnesium is vital to the well-being of all organisms. Magnesium is a relatively abundant ion in Earth's crust and mantle and is highly bioavailable in the hydrosphere. This availability, in combination with a useful and very unusual chemistry, may have led to its utilization in evolution as an ion for signaling, enzyme activation, and catalysis. However, the unusual nature of ionic magnesium has also led to a major challenge in the use of the ion in biological systems. Biological membranes are impermeable to magnesium (and other ions), so transport proteins must facilitate the flow of magnesium, both into and out of cells and intracellular compartments.

=== Human health ===
Inadequate magnesium intake frequently causes muscle spasms, and has been associated with cardiovascular disease, diabetes, high blood pressure, anxiety disorders, migraines, osteoporosis, and cerebral infarction. Acute deficiency (see hypomagnesemia) is rare, and is more common as a drug side-effect (such as chronic alcohol or diuretic use) than from low food intake, but it can occur in people fed intravenously for extended periods of time.

The most common symptom of excess oral magnesium intake is diarrhea. Supplements based on amino acid chelates (such as glycinate, lysinate etc.) are much better-tolerated by the digestive system and do not have the side-effects of the older compounds used, while sustained-release dietary supplements prevent the occurrence of diarrhea. Since the kidneys of adult humans excrete excess magnesium efficiently, oral magnesium poisoning in adults with normal renal function is very rare. Infants, which have less ability to excrete excess magnesium even when healthy, should not be given magnesium supplements, except under a physician's care.

Pharmaceutical preparations with magnesium are used to treat conditions including magnesium deficiency and hypomagnesemia, as well as eclampsia. Such preparations are usually in the form of magnesium sulfate or chloride when given parenterally. Magnesium is absorbed with reasonable efficiency (30–40%) by the body from any soluble magnesium salt, such as the chloride or citrate. Magnesium is similarly absorbed from Epsom salts, although the sulfate in these salts adds to their laxative effect at higher doses. Magnesium absorption from the insoluble oxide and hydroxide salts (milk of magnesia) is erratic and of poorer efficiency, since it depends on the neutralization and solution of the salt by the acid of the stomach, which may not be (and usually is not) complete.

Magnesium orotate may be used as adjuvant therapy in patients on optimal treatment for severe congestive heart failure, increasing survival rate and improving clinical symptoms and patient's quality of life.

In 2022, magnesium salts were the 207th most commonly prescribed medication in the United States, with more than 1 million prescriptions.

==== Nerve conduction ====
Magnesium can affect muscle relaxation through direct action on cell membranes. Mg^{2+} ions close certain types of calcium channels, which conduct positively charged calcium ions into neurons. With an excess of magnesium, more channels will be blocked and nerve cells' activity will decrease.

==== Hypertension ====
Intravenous magnesium sulphate is used in treating pre-eclampsia. For other than pregnancy-related hypertension, a meta-analysis of 22 clinical trials with dose ranges of 120 to 973 mg/day and a mean dose of 410 mg, concluded that magnesium supplementation had a small but statistically significant effect, lowering systolic blood pressure by 3–4 mm Hg and diastolic blood pressure by 2–3 mm Hg. The effect was larger when the dose was more than 370 mg/day.

==== Diabetes and glucose tolerance ====
Higher dietary intakes of magnesium correspond to lower diabetes incidence. For people with diabetes or at high risk of diabetes, magnesium supplementation lowers fasting glucose.

=== Mitochondria ===
Magnesium is essential as part of the process that generates adenosine triphosphate.

Mitochondria are often referred to as the "powerhouses of the cell" because their primary role is generating energy for cellular processes. They achieve this by breaking down nutrients, primarily glucose, through a series of chemical reactions known as cellular respiration. This process ultimately produces adenosine triphosphate (ATP), the cell's main energy currency.

=== Vitamin D ===
Magnesium and vitamin D have a synergistic relationship in the body, working together to optimize each other's functions.

=== Testosterone ===
It is theorized that the process of making testosterone from cholesterol, needs magnesium to function properly.

Studies have shown that significant gains in testosterone occur after taking 10 mg magnesium/kg body weight/day.

== Dietary recommendations ==
The U.S. Institute of Medicine (IOM) updated Estimated Average Requirements (EARs) and Recommended Dietary Allowances (RDAs) for magnesium in 1997. If there is not sufficient information to establish EARs and RDAs, an estimate designated Adequate Intake (AI) is used instead. The current EARs for magnesium for women and men ages 31 and up are 265 mg/day and 350 mg/day, respectively. The RDAs are 320 and 420 mg/day. RDAs are higher than EARs so as to identify amounts that will cover people with higher than average requirements. RDA for pregnancy is 350 to 400 mg/day depending on age of the woman. RDA for lactation ranges 310 to 360 mg/day for same reason. For children ages 1–13 years, the RDA increases with age from 65 to 200 mg/day. As for safety, the IOM also sets tolerable upper intake levels (ULs) for vitamins and minerals when evidence is sufficient. In the case of magnesium the UL is set at 350 mg/day. The UL is specific to magnesium consumed as a dietary supplement, the reason being that too much magnesium consumed at one time can cause diarrhea. The UL does not apply to food-sourced magnesium. Collectively the EARs, RDAs and ULs are referred to as Dietary Reference Intakes.

Reference Daily Intake of magnesium
Age	Male	Female	Pregnancy	Lactation
Birth to 6 months	30 mg*	30 mg*		
7–12 months	75 mg*	75 mg*		
1–3 years	80 mg	80 mg		
4–8 years	130 mg	130 mg		
9–13 years	240 mg	240 mg		
14–18 years	410 mg	360 mg	400 mg	360 mg
19–30 years	400 mg	310 mg	350 mg	310 mg
31–50 years	420 mg	320 mg	360 mg	320 mg
≥51 years	420 mg	320 mg		

* = Adequate intake

The European Food Safety Authority (EFSA) refers to the collective set of information as Dietary Reference Values, with Population Reference Intake (PRI) instead of RDA, and Average Requirement instead of EAR. AI and UL are defined the same as in the United States. For women and men ages 18 and older, the AIs are set at 300 and 350 mg/day, respectively. AIs for pregnancy and lactation are also 300 mg/day. For children ages 1–17 years, the AIs increase with age from 170 to 250 mg/day. These AIs are lower than the U.S. RDAs. The European Food Safety Authority reviewed the same safety question and set its UL at 250 mg/day – lower than the U.S. value. The magnesium UL is unique in that it is lower than some of the RDAs. It applies to intake from a pharmacological agent or dietary supplement only and does not include intake from food and water.

=== Labeling ===
For U.S. food and dietary supplement labeling purposes, the amount in a serving is expressed as a percent of daily value (%DV). For magnesium labeling purposes, 100% of the daily value was 400 mg, but as of May 27, 2016, it was revised to 420 mg to bring it into agreement with the RDA. A table of the old and new adult Daily Values is provided at Reference Daily Intake.

== Food sources ==
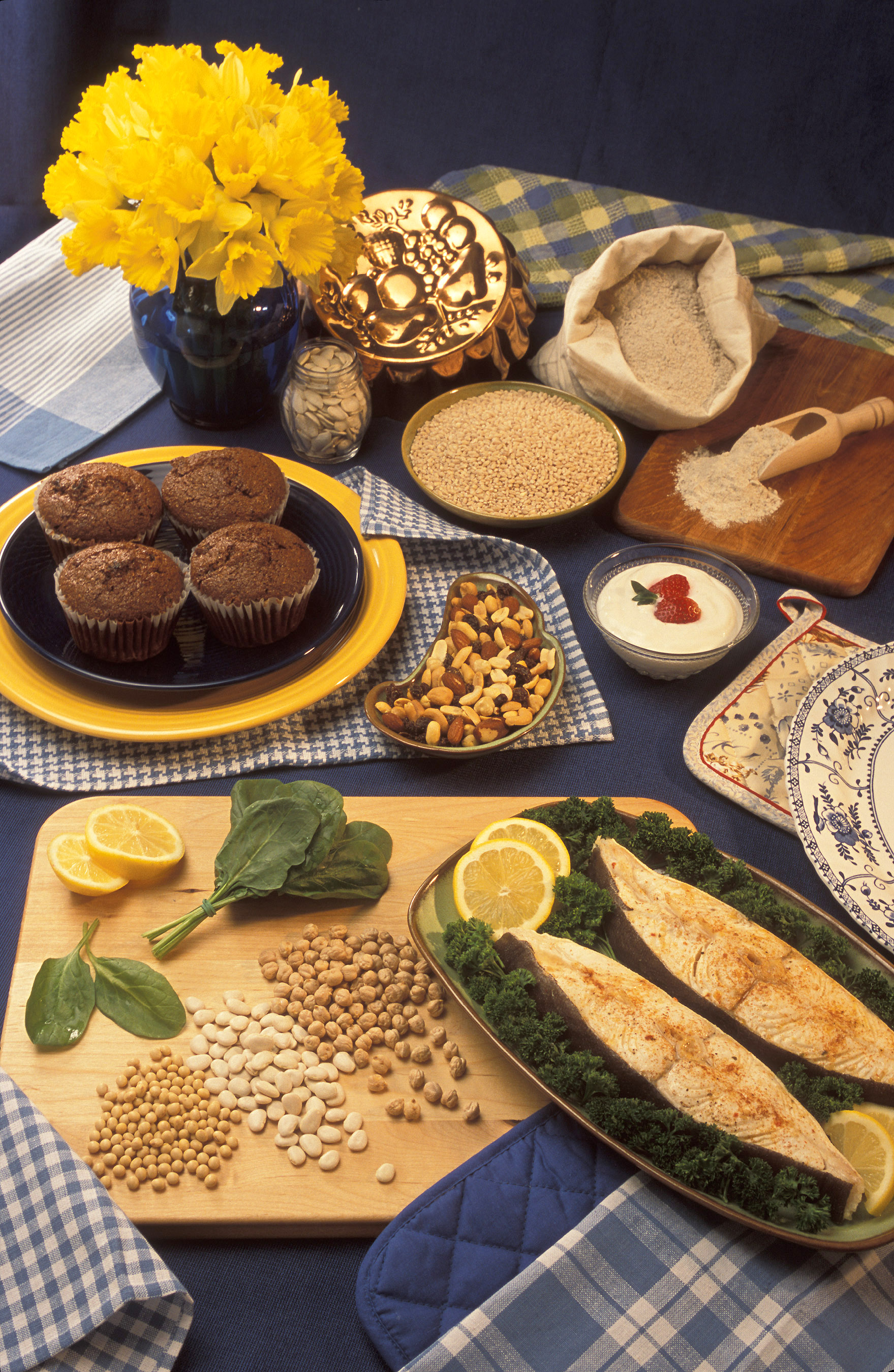
Some good sources of magnesium

Green vegetables, such as spinach, provide magnesium because of the abundance of chlorophyll molecules, which contain the ion. Nuts (especially Brazil nuts, cashews and almonds), seeds (e.g., pumpkin seeds), dark chocolate, roasted soybeans, bran, and some whole grains are also good sources of magnesium.

Although many foods contain magnesium, it is usually found in low levels. As with most nutrients, daily needs for magnesium are unlikely to be met by one serving of any single food. Eating a wide variety of fruits, vegetables, and grains will help ensure adequate intake of magnesium.

Because magnesium readily dissolves in water, refined foods, which are often processed or cooked in water and dried, in general, are poor sources of the nutrient. For example, whole-wheat bread has twice as much magnesium as white bread because the magnesium-rich germ and bran are removed when white flour is processed. The table of food sources of magnesium suggests many dietary sources of magnesium.

"Hard" water can also provide magnesium, but "soft" water contains less of the ion. Dietary surveys do not assess magnesium intake from water, which may lead to underestimating total magnesium intake and its variability.

Too much magnesium may make it difficult for the body to absorb calcium. Not enough magnesium can lead to hypomagnesemia as described above, with irregular heartbeats, high blood pressure (a sign in humans but not some experimental animals such as rodents), insomnia, and muscle spasms (fasciculation). However, as noted, symptoms of low magnesium from pure dietary deficiency are thought to be rarely encountered.

Following are some foods and the amount of magnesium in them:

- Pumpkin seeds, no hulls (1/4 cup) = 303 mg
- Chia seeds (1/4 cup) = 162 mg
- Buckwheat flour (1/2 cup) = 151 mg
- Brazil nuts (1/4 cup) = 125 mg
- Oat bran, raw (1/2 cup) = 110 mg
- Cocoa powder (1/4 cup) = 107 mg
- Halibut (3 oz) = 103 mg
- Almonds (1/4 cup) = 99 mg
- Cashews (1/4 cup) = 89 mg
- Whole wheat flour (1/2 cup) = 83 mg
- Spinach, boiled (1/2 cup) = 79 mg
- Swiss chard, boiled (1/2 cup) = 75 mg
- Chocolate, 70% cocoa (1 oz) = 73 mg
- Tofu, firm (1/2 cup) = 73 mg
- Black beans, boiled (1/2 cup) = 60 mg
- Quinoa, cooked (1/2 cup) = 59 mg
- Peanut butter (2 tablespoons) = 50 mg
- Walnuts (1/4 cup) = 46 mg
- Sunflower seeds, hulled (1/4 cup) = 41 mg
- Chickpeas, boiled (1/2 cup) = 39 mg
- Kale, boiled (1/2 cup) = 37 mg
- Lentils, boiled (1/2 cup) = 36 mg
- Oatmeal, cooked (1/2 cup) = 32 mg
- Fish sauce (1 tablespoon) = 32 mg
- Milk, non fat (1 cup) = 27 mg
- Coffee, espresso (1 oz) = 24 mg
- Whole wheat bread (1 slice) = 23 mg

== Biological range, distribution, and regulation ==
In animals, it has been shown that different cell types maintain different concentrations of magnesium. It seems likely that the same is true for plants. This suggests that different cell types may regulate influx and efflux of magnesium in different ways based on their unique metabolic needs. Interstitial and systemic concentrations of free magnesium must be delicately maintained by the combined processes of buffering (binding of ions to proteins and other molecules) and muffling (the transport of ions to storage or extracellular spaces).

In plants, and more recently in animals, magnesium has been recognized as an important signaling ion, both activating and mediating many biochemical reactions. The best example of this is perhaps the regulation of carbon fixation in chloroplasts in the Calvin cycle.

Magnesium is very important in cellular function. Deficiency of the nutrient causes disease of the affected organism. In single-cell organisms such as bacteria and yeast, low levels of magnesium manifests in greatly reduced growth rates. In magnesium transport knockout strains of bacteria, healthy rates are maintained only with exposure to very high external concentrations of the ion. In yeast, mitochondrial magnesium deficiency also leads to disease.

Plants deficient in magnesium show stress responses. The first observable signs of both magnesium starvation and overexposure in plants is a decrease in the rate of photosynthesis. This is due to the central position of the Mg^{2+} ion in the chlorophyll molecule. The later effects of magnesium deficiency on plants are a significant reduction in growth and reproductive viability. Magnesium can also be toxic to plants, although this is typically seen only in drought conditions.

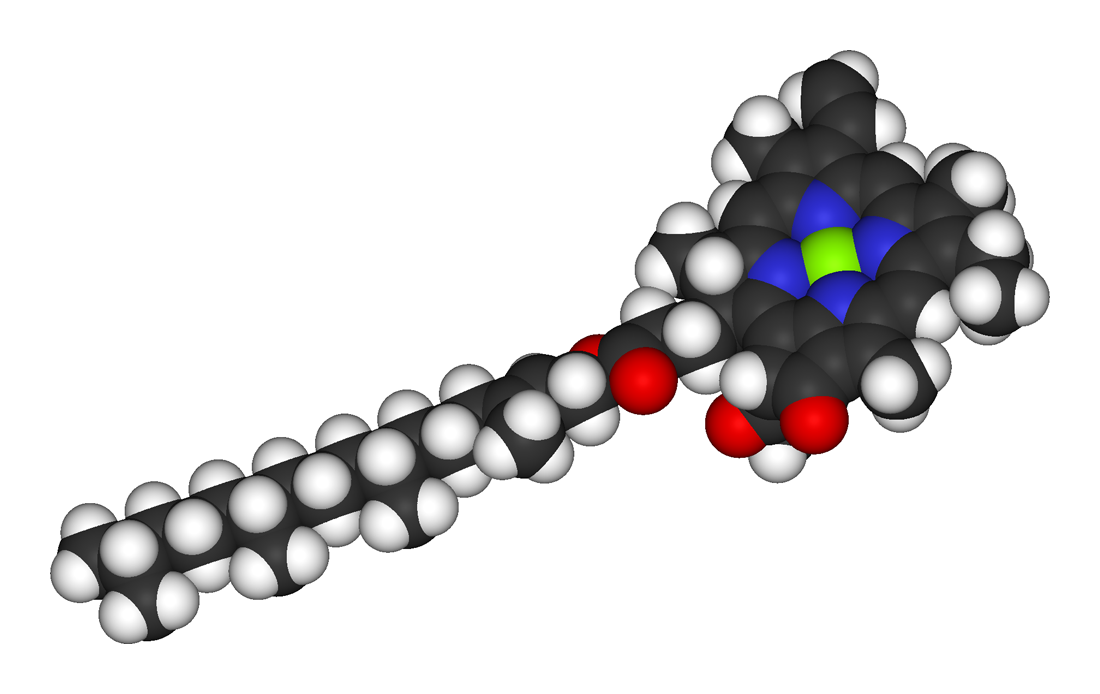
Space-filling model of the chlorophyll a molecule, with the magnesium ion (bright-green) visible at the center of the chlorin group

In animals, magnesium deficiency (hypomagnesemia) is seen when the environmental availability of magnesium is low. In ruminant animals, particularly vulnerable to magnesium availability in pasture grasses, the condition is known as 'grass tetany'. Hypomagnesemia is identified by a loss of balance due to muscle weakness. A number of genetically attributable hypomagnesemia disorders have also been identified in humans.

Overexposure to magnesium may be toxic to individual cells, though these effects have been difficult to show experimentally. Hypermagnesemia, an overabundance of magnesium in the blood, is usually caused by loss of kidney function. Healthy animals rapidly excrete excess magnesium in the urine and stool. Urinary magnesium is called magnesuria. Characteristic concentrations of magnesium in model organisms are: in E. coli 30–100 mM (bound), 0.01–1 mM (free), in budding yeast 50 mM, in mammalian cell 10 mM (bound), 0.5 mM (free) and in blood plasma 1 mM.

== Biological chemistry ==
Mg^{2+} is the fourth-most-abundant metal ion in cells (per moles) and the most abundant free divalent cation – as a result, it is deeply and intrinsically woven into cellular metabolism. Indeed, Mg^{2+}-dependent enzymes appear in virtually every metabolic pathway: Specific binding of Mg^{2+} to biological membranes is frequently observed, Mg^{2+} is also used as a signalling molecule, and much of nucleic acid biochemistry requires Mg^{2+}, including all reactions that require release of energy from ATP. In nucleotides, the triple-phosphate moiety of the compound is invariably stabilized by association with Mg^{2+} in all enzymatic processes.

=== Chlorophyll ===
In photosynthetic organisms, Mg^{2+} has the additional vital role of being the coordinating ion in the chlorophyll molecule. This role was discovered by Richard Willstätter, who received the Nobel Prize in Chemistry 1915 for the purification and structure of chlorophyll binding with sixth number of carbon

=== Enzymes ===
The chemistry of the Mg^{2+} ion, as applied to enzymes, uses the full range of this ion's unusual reaction chemistry to fulfill a range of functions. Mg^{2+} interacts with substrates, enzymes, and occasionally both (Mg^{2+} may form part of the active site). In general, Mg^{2+} interacts with substrates through inner sphere coordination, stabilising anions or reactive intermediates, also including binding to ATP and activating the molecule to nucleophilic attack. When interacting with enzymes and other proteins, Mg^{2+} may bind using inner or outer sphere coordination, to either alter the conformation of the enzyme or take part in the chemistry of the catalytic reaction. In either case, because Mg^{2+} is only rarely fully dehydrated during ligand binding, it may be a water molecule associated with the Mg^{2+} that is important rather than the ion itself. The Lewis acidity of Mg^{2+} (pK_{a} 11.4) is used to allow both hydrolysis and condensation reactions (most common ones being phosphate ester hydrolysis and phosphoryl transfer) that would otherwise require pH values greatly removed from physiological values.

=== Essential role in the biological activity of ATP ===
ATP (adenosine triphosphate), the main source of energy in cells, must be bound to a magnesium ion in order to be biologically active. What is called ATP is often actually Mg-ATP.

=== Nucleic acids ===
Nucleic acids have an important range of interactions with Mg^{2+}. The binding of Mg^{2+} to DNA and RNA stabilises structure; this can be observed in the increased melting temperature (T_{m}) of double-stranded DNA in the presence of Mg^{2+}. In addition, ribosomes contain large amounts of Mg^{2+} and the stabilisation provided is essential to the complexation of this ribo-protein. A large number of enzymes involved in the biochemistry of nucleic acids bind Mg^{2+} for activity, using the ion for both activation and catalysis. Finally, the autocatalysis of many ribozymes (enzymes containing only RNA) is Mg^{2+} dependent (e.g. the yeast mitochondrial group II self splicing introns).

Magnesium ions can be critical in maintaining the positional integrity of closely clustered phosphate groups. These clusters appear in numerous and distinct parts of the cell nucleus and cytoplasm. For instance, hexahydrated Mg^{2+} ions bind in the deep major groove and at the outer mouth of A-form nucleic acid duplexes.

=== Cell membranes and walls ===
Biological cell membranes and cell walls are polyanionic surfaces. This has important implications for the transport of ions, in particular because it has been shown that different membranes preferentially bind different ions. Both Mg^{2+} and Ca^{2+} regularly stabilize membranes by the cross-linking of carboxylated and phosphorylated head groups of lipids. However, the envelope membrane of E. coli has also been shown to bind Na^{+}, K^{+}, Mn^{2+} and Fe^{3+}. The transport of ions is dependent on both the concentration gradient of the ion and the electric potential (ΔΨ) across the membrane, which will be affected by the charge on the membrane surface. For example, the specific binding of Mg^{2+} to the chloroplast envelope has been implicated in a loss of photosynthetic efficiency by the blockage of K^{+} uptake and the subsequent acidification of the chloroplast stroma.

=== Proteins ===
The Mg^{2+} ion tends to bind only weakly to proteins (K_{a} ≤ 10^{5}) and this can be exploited by the cell to switch enzymatic activity on and off by changes in the local concentration of Mg^{2+}. Although the concentration of free cytoplasmic Mg^{2+} is on the order of 1 mmol/L, the total Mg^{2+} content of animal cells is 30 mmol/L and in plants the content of leaf endodermal cells has been measured at values as high as 100 mmol/L (Stelzer et al., 1990), much of which buffered in storage compartments. The cytoplasmic concentration of free Mg^{2+} is buffered by binding to chelators (e.g., ATP), but also, what is more important, it is buffered by storage of Mg^{2+} in intracellular compartments. The transport of Mg^{2+} between intracellular compartments may be a major part of regulating enzyme activity. The interaction of Mg^{2+} with proteins must also be considered for the transport of the ion across biological membranes.

=== Manganese ===
In biological systems, only manganese (Mn^{2+}) is readily capable of replacing Mg^{2+}, but only in a limited set of circumstances. Mn^{2+} is very similar to Mg^{2+} in terms of its chemical properties, including inner and outer shell complexation. Mn^{2+} effectively binds ATP and allows hydrolysis of the energy molecule by most ATPases. Mn^{2+} can also replace Mg^{2+} as the activating ion for a number of Mg^{2+}-dependent enzymes, although some enzyme activity is usually lost. Sometimes such enzyme metal preferences vary among closely related species: For example, the reverse transcriptase enzyme of lentiviruses like HIV, SIV and FIV is typically dependent on Mg^{2+}, whereas the analogous enzyme for other retroviruses prefers Mn^{2+}.

== Measuring magnesium in biological samples ==
=== By radioactive isotopes ===
The use of radioactive tracer elements in ion uptake assays allows the calculation of km, Ki and Vmax and determines the initial change in the ion content of the cells. ^{28}Mg decays by the emission of a high-energy beta or gamma particle, which can be measured using a scintillation counter. However, the radioactive half-life of ^{28}Mg, the most stable of the radioactive magnesium isotopes, is only 21 hours. This severely restricts the experiments involving the nuclide. Also, since 1990, no facility has routinely produced ^{28}Mg, and the price per mCi is now predicted to be approximately US$30,000. The chemical nature of Mg^{2+} is such that it is closely approximated by few other cations. However, Co^{2+}, Mn^{2+} and Ni^{2+} have been used successfully to mimic the properties of Mg^{2+} in some enzyme reactions, and radioactive forms of these elements have been employed successfully in cation transport studies. The difficulty of using metal ion replacement in the study of enzyme function is that the relationship between the enzyme activities with the replacement ion compared to the original is very difficult to ascertain.

=== By fluorescent indicators ===
A number of chelators of divalent cations have different fluorescence spectra in the bound and unbound states. Chelators for Ca^{2+} are well established, have high affinity for the cation, and low interference from other ions. Mg^{2+} chelators lag behind and the major fluorescence dye for Mg^{2+} (mag-fura 2) actually has a higher affinity for Ca^{2+}. This limits the application of this dye to cell types where the resting level of Ca^{2+} is < 1 μM and does not vary with the experimental conditions under which Mg^{2+} is to be measured. Recently, Otten et al. (2001) have described work into a new class of compounds that may prove more useful, having significantly better binding affinities for Mg^{2+}. The use of the fluorescent dyes is limited to measuring the free Mg^{2+}. If the ion concentration is buffered by the cell by chelation or removal to subcellular compartments, the measured rate of uptake will give only minimum values of km and Vmax.

=== By electrophysiology ===
First, ion-specific microelectrodes can be used to measure the internal free ion concentration of cells and organelles. The major advantages are that readings can be made from cells over relatively long periods of time, and that unlike dyes very little extra ion buffering capacity is added to the cells.

Second, the technique of two-electrode voltage-clamp allows the direct measurement of the ion flux across the membrane of a cell. The membrane is held at an electric potential and the responding current is measured. All ions passing across the membrane contribute to the measured current.

Third, the technique of patch-clamp uses isolated sections of natural or artificial membrane in much the same manner as voltage-clamp but without the secondary effects of a cellular system. Under ideal conditions the conductance of individual channels can be quantified. This methodology gives the most direct measurement of the action of ion channels.

=== By absorption spectroscopy ===
Flame atomic absorption spectroscopy (AAS) determines the total magnesium content of a biological sample. This method is destructive; biological samples must be broken down in concentrated acids to avoid clogging the fine nebulising apparatus. Beyond this, the only limitation is that samples must be in a volume of approximately 2 mL and at a concentration range of 0.1 – 0.4 μmol/L for optimum accuracy. As this technique cannot distinguish between Mg^{2+} already present in the cell and that taken up during the experiment, only content not uptaken can be quantified.

Inductively coupled plasma (ICP) using either the mass spectrometry (MS) or atomic emission spectroscopy (AES) modifications also allows the determination of the total ion content of biological samples.

== Magnesium transport ==
The chemical and biochemical properties of Mg^{2+} present the cellular system with a significant challenge when transporting the ion across biological membranes. The dogma of ion transport states that the transporter recognises the ion then progressively removes the water of hydration, removing most or all of the water at a selective pore before releasing the ion on the far side of the membrane. Due to the properties of Mg^{2+}, large volume change from hydrated to bare ion, high energy of hydration and very low rate of ligand exchange in the inner coordination sphere, these steps are probably more difficult than for most other ions. To date, only the ZntA protein of Paramecium has been shown to be a Mg^{2+} channel. The mechanisms of Mg^{2+} transport by the remaining proteins are beginning to be uncovered with the first three-dimensional structure of a Mg^{2+} transport complex being solved in 2004.

The hydration shell of the Mg^{2+} ion has a very tightly bound inner shell of six water molecules and a relatively tightly bound second shell containing 12–14 water molecules (Markham et al., 2002). Thus, it is presumed that recognition of the Mg^{2+} ion requires some mechanism to interact initially with the hydration shell of Mg^{2+}, followed by a direct recognition/binding of the ion to the protein.

In spite of the mechanistic difficulty, Mg^{2+} must be transported across membranes, and a large number of Mg^{2+} fluxes across membranes from a variety of systems have been described. However, only a small selection of Mg^{2+} transporters have been characterised at the molecular level.

=== Ligand ion channel blockade ===
Magnesium ions (Mg^{2+}) in cellular biology are usually in almost all senses opposite to Ca^{2+} ions, because they are bivalent too, but have greater electronegativity and thus exert greater pull on water molecules, preventing passage through the channel (even though the magnesium itself is smaller). Thus, Mg^{2+} ions block Ca^{2+} channels such as (NMDA channels) and have been shown to affect gap junction channels forming electrical synapses.

== Plant physiology of magnesium ==
The previous sections have dealt in detail with the chemical and biochemical aspects of Mg^{2+} and its transport across cellular membranes. This section will apply this knowledge to aspects of whole plant physiology, in an attempt to show how these processes interact with the larger and more complex environment of the multicellular organism.

=== Nutritional requirements and interactions ===
Mg^{2+} is essential for plant growth and is present in higher plants in amounts on the order of 80 μmol g^{−1} dry weight. The amounts of Mg^{2+} vary in different parts of the plant and are dependent upon nutritional status. In times of plenty, excess Mg^{2+} may be stored in vascular cells (Stelzer et al., 1990; and in times of starvation Mg^{2+} is redistributed, in many plants, from older to newer leaves.

Mg^{2+} is taken up into plants via the roots. Interactions with other cations in the rhizosphere can have a significant effect on the uptake of the ion.(Kurvits and Kirkby, 1980; The structure of root cell walls is highly permeable to water and ions, and hence ion uptake into root cells can occur anywhere from the root hairs to cells located almost in the centre of the root (limited only by the Casparian strip). Plant cell walls and membranes carry a great number of negative charges, and the interactions of cations with these charges is key to the uptake of cations by root cells allowing a local concentrating effect. Mg2+ binds relatively weakly to these charges, and can be displaced by other cations, impeding uptake and causing deficiency in the plant.

Within individual plant cells, the Mg^{2+} requirements are largely the same as for all cellular life; Mg^{2+} is used to stabilise membranes, is vital to the utilisation of ATP, is extensively involved in the nucleic acid biochemistry, and is a cofactor for many enzymes (including the ribosome). Also, Mg^{2+} is the coordinating ion in the chlorophyll molecule. It is the intracellular compartmentalisation of Mg^{2+} in plant cells that leads to additional complexity. Four compartments within the plant cell have reported interactions with Mg^{2+}. Initially, Mg^{2+} will enter the cell into the cytoplasm (by an as yet unidentified system), but free Mg^{2+} concentrations in this compartment are tightly regulated at relatively low levels (≈2 mmol/L) and so any excess Mg^{2+} is either quickly exported or stored in the second intracellular compartment, the vacuole. The requirement for Mg^{2+} in mitochondria has been demonstrated in yeast and it seems highly likely that the same will apply in plants. The chloroplasts also require significant amounts of internal Mg^{2+}, and low concentrations of cytoplasmic Mg^{2+}. In addition, it seems likely that the other subcellular organelles (e.g., Golgi, endoplasmic reticulum, etc.) also require Mg^{2+}.

=== Distributing magnesium ions within the plant ===
Once in the cytoplasmic space of root cells Mg^{2+}, along with the other cations, is probably transported radially into the stele and the vascular tissue. From the cells surrounding the xylem the ions are released or pumped into the xylem and carried up through the plant. In the case of Mg^{2+}, which is highly mobile in both the xylem and phloem, the ions will be transported to the top of the plant and back down again in a continuous cycle of replenishment. Hence, uptake and release from vascular cells is probably a key part of whole plant Mg^{2+} homeostasis. Figure 1 shows how few processes have been connected to their molecular mechanisms (only vacuolar uptake has been associated with a transport protein, AtMHX).

The diagram shows a schematic of a plant and the putative processes of Mg^{2+} transport at the root and leaf where Mg^{2+} is loaded and unloaded from the vascular tissues. Mg^{2+} is taken up into the root cell wall space (1) and interacts with the negative charges associated with the cell walls and membranes. Mg^{2+} may be taken up into cells immediately (symplastic pathway) or may travel as far as the Casparian band (4) before being absorbed into cells (apoplastic pathway; 2). The concentration of Mg^{2+} in the root cells is probably buffered by storage in root cell vacuoles (3). Note that cells in the root tip do not contain vacuoles. Once in the root cell cytoplasm, Mg^{2+} travels toward the centre of the root by plasmodesmata, where it is loaded into the xylem (5) for transport to the upper parts of the plant. When the Mg^{2+} reaches the leaves it is unloaded from the xylem into cells (6) and again is buffered in vacuoles (7). Whether cycling of Mg^{2+} into the phloem occurs via general cells in the leaf (8) or directly from xylem to phloem via transfer cells (9) is unknown. Mg^{2+} may return to the roots in the phloem sap.

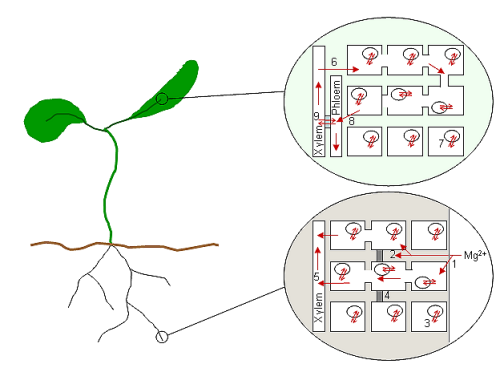
Figure 1: Magnesium in the whole plant

When a Mg^{2+} ion has been absorbed by a cell requiring it for metabolic processes, it is generally assumed that the ion stays in that cell for as long as the cell is active. In vascular cells, this is not always the case; in times of plenty, Mg^{2+} is stored in the vacuole, takes no part in the day-to-day metabolic processes of the cell (Stelzer et al., 1990), and is released at need. But for most cells it is death by senescence or injury that releases Mg^{2+} and many of the other ionic constituents, recycling them into healthy parts of the plant. In addition, when Mg^{2+} in the environment is limiting, some species are able to mobilise Mg^{2+} from older tissues. These processes involve the release of Mg^{2+} from its bound and stored states and its transport back into the vascular tissue, where it can be distributed to the rest of the plant. In times of growth and development, Mg^{2+} is also remobilised within the plant as source and sink relationships change.

The homeostasis of Mg^{2+} within single plant cells is maintained by processes occurring at the plasma membrane and at the vacuole membrane (see Figure 2). The major driving force for the translocation of ions in plant cells is ΔpH. H^{+}-ATPases pump H^{+} ions against their concentration gradient to maintain the pH differential that can be used for the transport of other ions and molecules. H^{+} ions are pumped out of the cytoplasm into the extracellular space or into the vacuole. The entry of Mg^{2+} into cells may occur through one of two pathways, via channels using the ΔΨ (negative inside) across this membrane or by symport with H^{+} ions. To transport the Mg^{2+} ion into the vacuole requires a Mg^{2+}/H^{+} antiport transporter (such as AtMHX). The H^{+}-ATPases are dependent on Mg^{2+} (bound to ATP) for activity, so that Mg^{2+} is required to maintain its own homeostasis.

A schematic of a plant cell is shown including the four major compartments currently recognised as interacting with Mg^{2+}. H^{+}-ATPases maintain a constant ΔpH across the plasma membrane and the vacuole membrane. Mg^{2+} is transported into the vacuole using the energy of ΔpH (in A. thaliana by AtMHX). Transport of Mg^{2+} into cells may use either the negative ΔΨ or the ΔpH. The transport of Mg^{2+} into mitochondria probably uses ΔΨ as in the mitochondria of yeast, and it is likely that chloroplasts take Mg^{2+} by a similar system. The mechanism and the molecular basis for the release of Mg^{2+} from vacuoles and from the cell is not known. Likewise, the light-regulated Mg^{2+} concentration changes in chloroplasts are not fully understood, but do require the transport of H^{+} ions across the thylakoid membrane.

Figure 2: Magnesium in the plant cell

=== Magnesium, chloroplasts and photosynthesis ===
Mg^{2+} is the coordinating metal ion in the chlorophyll molecule, and in plants where the ion is in high supply about 6% of the total Mg^{2+} is bound to chlorophyll. Thylakoid stacking is stabilised by Mg^{2+} and is important for the efficiency of photosynthesis, allowing phase transitions to occur.

Mg^{2+} is probably taken up into chloroplasts to the greatest extent during the light-induced development from proplastid to chloroplast or etioplast to chloroplast. At these times, the synthesis of chlorophyll and the biogenesis of the thylakoid membrane stacks absolutely require the divalent cation.

Whether Mg^{2+} is able to move into and out of chloroplasts after this initial developmental phase has been the subject of several conflicting reports. Deshaies et al. (1984) found that Mg^{2+} did move in and out of isolated chloroplasts from young pea plants, but Gupta and Berkowitz (1989) were unable to reproduce the result using older spinach chloroplasts. Deshaies et al. had stated in their paper that older pea chloroplasts showed less significant changes in Mg^{2+} content than those used to form their conclusions. The relative proportion of immature chloroplasts present in the preparations may explain these observations.

The metabolic state of the chloroplast changes considerably between night and day. During the day, the chloroplast is actively harvesting the energy of light and converting it into chemical energy. The activation of the metabolic pathways involved comes from the changes in the chemical nature of the stroma on the addition of light. H^{+} is pumped out of the stroma (into both the cytoplasm and the lumen) leading to an alkaline pH. Mg^{2+} (along with K^{+}) is released from the lumen into the stroma, in an electroneutralisation process to balance the flow of H^{+}. Finally, thiol groups on enzymes are reduced by a change in the redox state of the stroma. Examples of enzymes activated in response to these changes are fructose 1,6-bisphosphatase, sedoheptulose bisphosphatase and ribulose-1,5-bisphosphate carboxylase. During the dark period, if these enzymes were active a wasteful cycling of products and substrates would occur.

Two major classes of the enzymes that interact with Mg^{2+} in the stroma during the light phase can be identified. Firstly, enzymes in the glycolytic pathway most often interact with two atoms of Mg^{2+}. The first atom is as an allosteric modulator of the enzymes' activity, while the second forms part of the active site and is directly involved in the catalytic reaction. The second class of enzymes includes those where the Mg^{2+} is complexed to nucleotide di- and tri-phosphates (ADP and ATP), and the chemical change involves phosphoryl transfer. Mg^{2+} may also serve in a structural maintenance role in these enzymes (e.g., enolase).

=== Magnesium stress ===
Plant stress responses can be observed in plants that are under- or over-supplied with Mg^{2+}. The first observable signs of Mg^{2+} stress in plants for both starvation and toxicity is a depression of the rate of photosynthesis, it is presumed because of the strong relationships between Mg^{2+} and chloroplasts/chlorophyll. In pine trees, even before the visible appearance of yellowing and necrotic spots, the photosynthetic efficiency of the needles drops markedly. In Mg^{2+} deficiency, reported secondary effects include carbohydrate immobility, loss of RNA transcription and loss of protein synthesis. However, due to the mobility of Mg^{2+} within the plant, the deficiency phenotype may be present only in the older parts of the plant. For example, in Pinus radiata starved of Mg^{2+}, one of the earliest identifying signs is the chlorosis in the needles on the lower branches of the tree. This is because Mg^{2+} has been recovered from these tissues and moved to growing (green) needles higher in the tree.

A Mg^{2+} deficit can be caused by the lack of the ion in the media (soil), but more commonly comes from inhibition of its uptake. Mg^{2+} binds quite weakly to the negatively charged groups in the root cell walls, so that excesses of other cations such as K^{+}, NH_{4}^{+}, Ca^{2+}, and Mn^{2+} can all impede uptake.(Kurvits and Kirkby, 1980; In acid soils Al^{3+} is a particularly strong inhibitor of Mg^{2+} uptake. The inhibition by Al^{3+} and Mn^{2+} is more severe than can be explained by simple displacement, hence it is possible that these ions bind to the Mg^{2+} uptake system directly. In bacteria and yeast, such binding by Mn^{2+} has already been observed. Stress responses in the plant develop as cellular processes halt due to a lack of Mg^{2+} (e.g. maintenance of ΔpH across the plasma and vacuole membranes). In Mg^{2+}-starved plants under low light conditions, the percentage of Mg^{2+} bound to chlorophyll has been recorded at 50%. Presumably, this imbalance has detrimental effects on other cellular processes.

Mg^{2+} toxicity stress is more difficult to develop. When Mg^{2+} is plentiful, in general the plants take up the ion and store it (Stelzer et al., 1990). However, if this is followed by drought then ionic concentrations within the cell can increase dramatically. High cytoplasmic Mg^{2+} concentrations block a K^{+} channel in the inner envelope membrane of the chloroplast, in turn inhibiting the removal of H^{+} ions from the chloroplast stroma. This leads to an acidification of the stroma that inactivates key enzymes in carbon fixation, which all leads to the production of oxygen free radicals in the chloroplast that then cause oxidative damage.

== See also ==
- Biology and pharmacology of chemical elements
- Calcium in biology
- Iodine in biology
- Ion channels – Pore-forming membrane protein
- Magnesium deficiency (agriculture)
- Magnesium deficiency (medicine) – Condition of low level of magnesium in the body
- Myers' cocktail – Questionable IV vitamin alternative therapy
- Osteoporosis – Skeletal disorder
- Potassium in biology
- Selenium in biology
- Sodium in biology
