= Lower Spat Gah Hydropower Project =

- Country: Pakistan
- Location: Kohistan, Khyber Pakhtunkhwa
- Coordinates: 35°14′07″N 73°11′58″E
- Status: Proposed
- Construction began: Expected in 2026
- Owners: DL Energy and Korea Hydro & Nuclear Power
- Operators: DL Energy and Korea Hydro & Nuclear Power

Power generation
- Nameplate capacity: 496 MW
- Annual net output: 2,007 GWh

Lower Spat Gah Hydropower Project is a hydroelectric power project located in Kohistan, Khyber Pakhtunkhwa province of Pakistan.

== Overview ==
The project is located on the left tributary of the river Indus, 8 km below Dasu city, 35 km above Patan city and 365 km from Islamabad. It is designed for a discharge capacity of 81 m3/sec.

The project is being financed by a Korean company by DL Energy and Korea Hydro and Nuclear Power. The company plans to invest more than $1 billion in the project. The project is expected to produce 2,007 GWh of energy annually.

The installed capacity of the project is 496 MW. This is a run-of-river project. The total head of the project will be 745m.

== Development ==
The project is currently at the permitting stage and is expected to be developed in a single phase. Construction of the project is expected to begin in 2026 and is expected to enter commercial operation in 2029. The project is being developed under Public Private Partnership, The Government of Khyber Pakhtunkhwa is investing 26% equity in the project.
