= Variation potential =

A variation potential (VP) (also called slow wave potential) is a hydraulically propagating electrical signal occurring exclusively in plant cells. It is one of three propagating signals in plants, the other two being action potential (AP) and wound potential (WP) (also unique to plants). Variation potentials are responsible for the induction of many physiological processes and are a mechanism for plant systematic responses to local wounding. They induce changes in gene expression; the production of abscisic acid, jasmonic acid, and ethylene; temporary decreases in photosynthesis; and increases in respiration. Variation potentials have been widely shown in vascular plants.

A variation potential, like an action potential, is a temporary change in the membrane potential of the plant cell by depolarization and consequent repolarization. However, it is distinguished by its slower, delayed repolarization phase, variability in shape and amplitude, and the decrease in its velocity with increasing distance from the initial point. Variation potentials can only be produced if the pressure in the xylem is disturbed and followed by an increase in xylem pressure. Additionally, it uses vascular bundles to complete systemic potential throughout the plant.

Variation potentials are distinct from action potentials in their cause of stimulation. Depolarization arises from an increase in plant cell turgor pressure from a hydraulic pressure wave that moves through the xylem after events like rain, embolism, bending, local wounds, organ excision, and local burning. Unlike action potentials, variation potentials are not all or nothing.

Depolarization of a variation potential is determined by the difference in pressure between the atmosphere and the plant's intact interior. However, it has been shown that variation potentials can be suppressed by high humidity and continued darkness. The ionic mechanism is assumed to involve a brief shutdown of the P-type H+ -ATPase in the plasma membrane.

Variation potential propagation is accomplished hydraulically by moving with a rapid pressure increase that establishes an axial pressure gradient in the xylem. This gradient transforms with distance into increasing lag phases for the pressure-induced depolarization in the epidermal cells. This allows for communication between the leaf and stem that can move in both directions along the axis of the plant.
