= Hydraulic signaling in plants =

Hydraulic signals in plants are detected as changes in the organism's water potential that are caused by environmental stress like drought or wounding. The cohesion and tension properties of water allow for these water potential changes to be transmitted throughout the plant.

Plants respond to external stimuli through thigmomorphogenesis. For example, bending a shoot can cause arrestment of growth on another area of the plant. These types of nonlocal responses can be induced by long distance signaling. Long distance communication in plants must satisfy two things: First, signaling must occur rapidly to an apical area of the plant; Second, the signal must be perceived at the apical site and be converted to a physiological or thigmorphogenetic response. One form of long distance signaling is through hydraulic pulses from the roots to the shoots of a plant. Tree branches and stems contain microchannels that make up the xylem network and serve to carry water longitudinally. Stimuli like wounding can cause tension and compression of plant tissues, which pinches the cross section of the shoot. Hydraulic signaling begins with a local response like water expulsion, creating a suction in the vascular system. The compression of the cross section will then lead to a general increase of hydraulic pressure in the channels of the shoot. This extensive change in hydraulic pressure will lead to activation of hydraulic sensors.

== Water potential ==
The driving force of the movement of water is the water potential gradient. The water potential gradient is defined by comparing the potential energy of water to pure water at standard conditions. This water potential gradient must be maintained from the soil through the plant and into the air via transpiration. In the xylem, water is transported throughout the plant following increasing water potential differences. These differences are determined by soil water availability and vapor pressure deficit. If this gradient is flipped the translocation of water will occur in the opposite direction. The water potential is the combination of the pressure potential, the osmotic potential and the gravitational contribution. The translocation of water can be restricted by resistances like stomatal aperture, xylem structure related resistance to flow etc.

== Long-distance signaling ==
In order for plants to respond and adapt to external stimuli, long distance signaling is required. In general terms, long distance signaling is defined as the ability to have a widespread response when just one distinct area is stimulated. In plants, water uptake must be tightly controlled, so long-distance signaling by hydraulic cues coordinate plants above and below-ground organs. The daily physiological behavior of plants is tightly controlled by hydraulic signals. Gradients of water potentials are transferred across the plant through hydraulic signals. If the hydraulic signal originated in the root, it will result in local water potential changes, and consequently turgor changes. The water potential changes can be due to dry soil, water loss via transpiration or physically wounding the plant. These local water potential changes are then transmitted quickly over long-distances as hydraulic signals. Hydraulic signaling is fast and effective because of the cohesion and tension properties of water. Hydraulic signals can be propagated downward or upward, relaying water potential gradients throughout the entire plant.

Hydraulic signals can be sensed in a few ways all relating to how an increase in water potential affects the plants. Because water leaves the cell, there is a reduction in the pressure potential and an increase in solute concentration. This is one way the hydraulic signal can be sensed, through sensing the osmotic environment. Increase in water potential also causes mechanical forces on the cell wall and plasma membrane of the cell. This is the second way to sense hydraulic signaling, by sensing the changes in the mechanical forces on the cell wall.

== Experimental methods for studying hydraulic signaling ==
=== Linear beam theory ===
Biomimetic systems can be used to mimic the microchannels inside branches. These synthetic plant systems are made from polydimethylsiloxane (PDMS) and 3D molded like branches and filled with a silicone oil (with viscosity 1 Pa*s). Channels are connected by a differential pressure sensor. The initial branch is straight and the internal water pressure is equal to the atmospheric pressure |Pref-P0=0|. Hydraulic pulses are then induced by automated linear motor deplacement, creating a bend in the synthetic branches which results in a rise in overpressure (Pref), reaching a value of |Pref-P0| or deltaP. Returning back to the initial state of the branch will bring the value of deltaP back to 0. The observation is that overpressure increases quadratically with bending strain. This response changes with variation in beam rigidity.

=== Nonlinear poroelastic coupling ===
In a nonlinear poroelastic system, elastic tubes begin straight. When bent, elastic strain increases proportionally with the distance from the initial position. This induces a bending elastic energy per unit of volume that is quadratically related to the transverse radius. The system will lower this elastic energy by squeezing its cross section. This transverse compression leads to a decrease in the channel volume creating a global increase in pressure. Therefore, the mechanism of generating hydraulic pressure is due to the coupling of bending and the transverse deformation of the elastic beam.

=== Hydraulic signaling in natural branches ===
Louf et al. has conducted research on hydraulic signaling in 3 species: P. sylvestris, Quercus ilex, and P.alba. Their findings can be summarized by these points: Bending of a branch leads to an increase in xylem water pressure. The magnitude of response depends on the species of plant and the environmental conditions. Hydraulic pulses were found to be greater in trees grown outside with stiffer properties, also proving that elasticity plays a role in hydraulic pulses.

== Mechanism ==
The overall pathway of hydraulic signaling in plants is similar to that of a sensory pathway, starting with basic perception of the signal by a sensor, which then converts the hydraulic signal into a chemical signal: abscisic acid or ABA. This conversion to a chemical signal leads to the control of different physiological responses in the plant since ABA is a plant hormone known to mediate many plant developmental processes including organ size, stomatal closure, and dormancy in the plants’ seeds and buds.

Hydraulic signals are primarily detected as decreases in water potential, usually caused by increases in solute concentration or drought. This decrease in water potential is systemic and transferred throughout the plant vascular network via the xylem. Water follows down the water potential gradient from parenchyma cells into the xylem, ultimately leading to a decrease in pressure potential and osmotic potential in the adjacent cells to the xylem. The hydraulic sensor, which is yet to be known, resides on the inner membrane of the parenchyma cells and detects the decreases in pressure and solute potential through an unknown mechanism. After detection, the unidentified sensor initiates a signal cascade, leading to a calcium transient and subsequent reactive oxygen species (ROS) formation. These ROS are proposed to go on to target ABA biosynthesis enzymes, leading to synthesis of ABA in the parenchyma and later export to regions of the plant requiring the appropriate responses. In an example, ABA response to a hydraulic signal from the roots- a decrease in water potential- is thought to reach the guard cells to stimulate stomatal closure. Despite an unidentified hydraulic sensor(s) and the mechanism of which this sensor detects decreases in pressure and solute potential in the parenchyma, this primary site of ABA biosynthesis is thought to additionally participate as the main location of hydraulic signal perception, vital to mediation of water potential in the plant.

== ABA ==
Abscisic acid (ABA) is a phytohormone that plays a significant role in the plants’ response to drought conditions. During drought, its biosynthesis is triggered and controls many physiological responses. ABA triggers root growth at low concentrations and closes stomata to prevent water loss from transpiration. ABA is essential for hydraulic signals because of its response to local water potential changes. ABA is also known to increase hydraulic conductance by increasing aquaporin expression.

== Hydraulic sensors ==
Although sensor(s) for hydraulic signals are unknown and still being investigated, several sensor candidates have been suggested. One candidate for a hydraulic signal sensor has been MCA1, a plasma membrane protein correlated with mechanosensing via calcium-mediated influx in Arabidopsis thaliana. Research has found that MCA1 increased cytoplasmic calcium concentrations in response to a mechanosensory input: plasma membrane distortion in Arabidopsis.

Another sensor candidate proposed are PERKs, members of the proline-rich receptor kinase family in Arabidopsis as well. PERK4 specifically plays a crucial role in abscisic acid (ABA) signalling and response and has shown to be an ABA- and calcium-activated protein kinase. Both MCA1 and PERK4 appear to correlate with cytoplasmic calcium gradients and an early response to hydraulic signals since calcium is known to be involved in plants’ early responses to mechanosensation.

Despite research on these sensor candidates, both ABA and calcium gradient participation in early events of hydraulic signaling have made it particularly difficult to distinguish the order of which each part plays in the hydraulic signaling pathway.

=== MCA1 ===
MCA1 has been identified as a candidate for a Ca2+ permeable mechanosensitive channel in Arabidopsis thaliana. Overexpression of plasma membrane protein MCA1 causes an increase in calcium uptake from the roots, which then causes an increase in free calcium in the cytoplasm. MCA1 expression in yeast mutants lacking a high affinity calcium influx system will also increase calcium uptake.

=== MCA2 ===
MCA2 is a paralog of MCA1 that was identified in Arabidopsis thaliana. Protein sequencing technology reveals that the two genes are 72.7% identical and 89.4% similar in amino acid sequence, making MCA2 a reasonable gene to use in studies to determine the function of MCA1 in calcium uptake. Reverse transcription PCR analysis indicates that MCA2 is expressed in the plasma membrane in leaves, flowers, roots, and stems. Knockout of the MCA2 gene causes a decrease in calcium uptake in the roots, relative to the wildtype, suggesting that the MCA2 gene is involved in calcium uptake.

Using GUS staining, researchers were able to find expressions of MCA1 and MCA2 in the pericycle and endodermis of the root in Arabidopsis. No expression was identified in the cortex or epidermis. Rise in cytosolic calcium levels in the pericycle and endodermis under drought conditions suggest that these cells play a role in calcium signaling. The spatial expression of MCA1 and MCA2 and the changes in calcium concentration in the pericycle and endodermis suggests that both MCA1 and MCA2 play a role in symplastic calcium transport and signaling.

=== PERK4 ===
Proline-rich extensin-like receptor kinases 4 (PERK4) is a gene expressed in the roots and flowers in Arabidopsis thaliana that localizes in the plasma membrane and plays a role in ABA signaling. Using protein motif analysis, a membrane localization signal, a transmembrane domain, and an intracellular kinase domain were identified in PERK4. To study the role of PERK4 and ABA, mutants were made by inserting T-DNA. PERK4 mutants showed a decrease in ABA sensitivity which affects seedling germination and root tip growth. Mutating PERK4 causes cytosolic free calcium levels to decrease in roots relevant to the wild type. The function of PERK4 has been proposed in early stage ABA signalling to inhibit root elongation by disturbing cytoplasmic calcium gradients.

== Ongoing research ==
Arabidopsis thaliana has been a primary model system in the search for the hydraulic sensor however, has not yet produced a certain answer. Screens for plant mutants affected in hydraulic signaling have been necessary yet, none have been reported so far. Some plant mutants have been distinguished by using the Arabidopsis line pAtH-B6::LUC with lesions upstream of ABA action. Recent years prior to 2013 have shown more hydraulic sensor candidates such as osmosensors and turgor sensors however, research is ongoing as to the specific roles they may play in hydraulic signaling in plants.
