= Public-Private Partnership Authority (Pakistan) =

Pakistani government agency

- پبلک پرائیویٹ پارٹنرشپ اتھارٹی
- Abbreviation: P3A
- Predecessor: Infrastructure Project Development Facility
- Formation: 2017; 9 years ago
- Type: Governmental
- Headquarters: Islamabad, Pakistan
- Coordinates: 33.73326642353709°N 73.08847516083353°E
- Region served: Pakistan
- Official language: English & Urdu
- Chairperson: Ahsan Iqbal
- Website: www.p3a.gov.pk

The Public-Private Partnership Authority (P3A) is an organization established by the Government of Pakistan to leverage the expertise of the private sector to supplement the public sector service delivery. It was formed in 2017 after the approval of the Public-Private Partnership Authority Act, 2017, replacing the Infrastructure Project Development Facility (IPDF), which was a public limited company under the Ministry of Finance.

The authority is responsible for creating a regulatory framework to attract the private sector to invest in various projects. Similarly, Public Private Partnership Acts have been made in all the four provinces of Pakistan.
