= Proton ATPase =

Class of enzymes

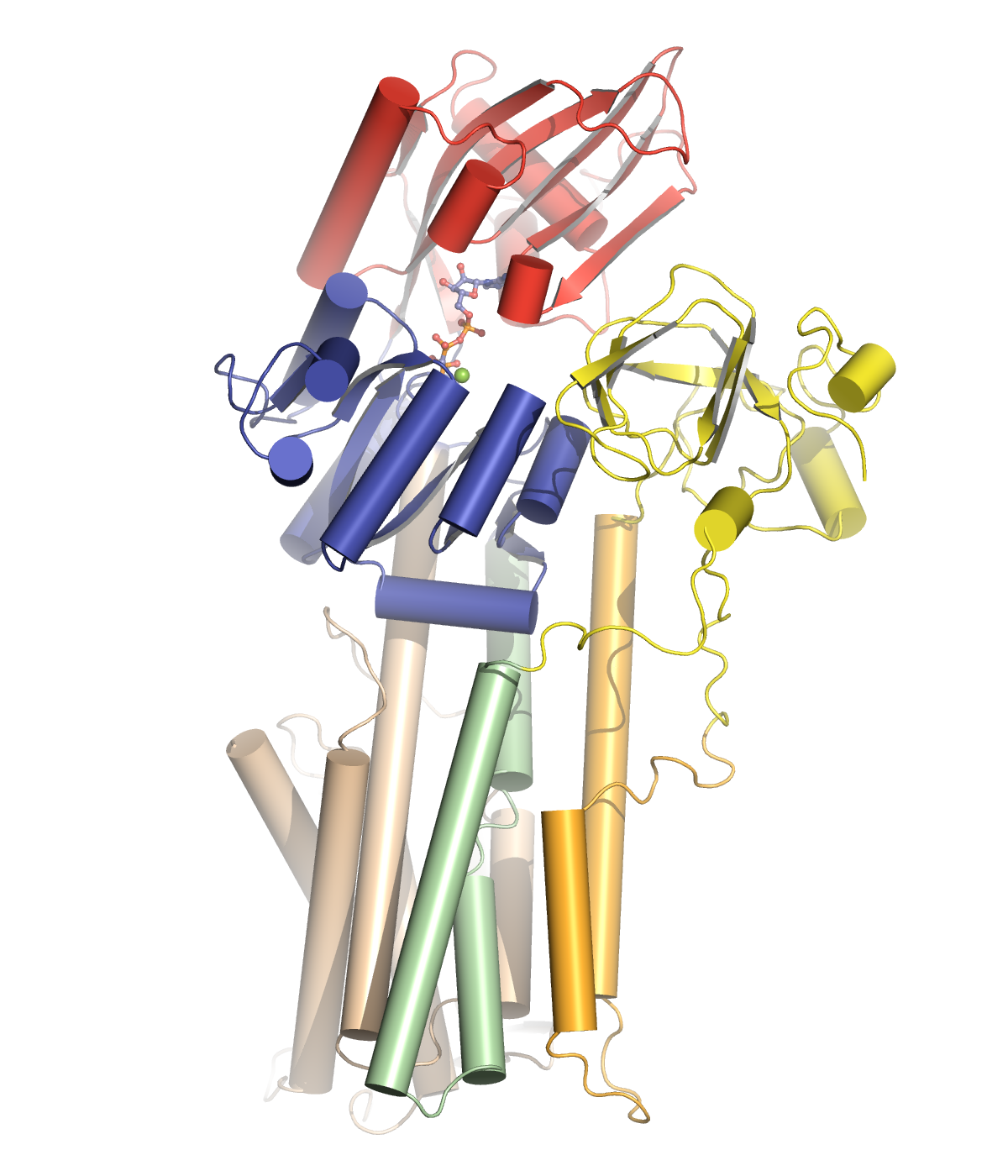
Example of P-type Proton ATPase, graphic representation

In the field of enzymology, a proton ATPase, or H^{+}-ATPase, is an enzyme that catalyzes the following chemical reaction:

ATP + H_{2}O + H^{+}_{in} $\rightleftharpoons$ ADP + phosphate + H^{+}_{out}

The 3 substrates of this enzyme are ATP, H_{2}O, and H^{+}, whereas its 3 products are ADP, phosphate, and H^{+}.

Proton ATPases are divided into three groups as outlined below:

== P-type proton ATPase ==
P-type ATPases form a covalent phosphorylated (hence the symbol ’P') intermediate as part of its reaction cycle. P-type ATPases undergo major conformational changes during the catalytic cycle. P-type ATPases are not evolutionary related to V- and F-type ATPases.

=== Plasma membrane H^{+}-ATPase ===
P-type proton ATPase (or plasma membrane H^{+}-ATPase) is found in the plasma membranes of eubacteria, archaea, protozoa, fungi and plants. Here it serves as a functional equivalent to the Na^{+}/K^{+} ATPase of animal cells; i.e. it energizes the plasma membrane by forming an electrochemical gradient of protons (Na^{+} in animal cells), that in turn drives secondary active transport processes across the membrane. The plasma membrane H^{+}-ATPase is a P3A ATPase with a single polypeptide of 70-100 kDa.

=== Gastric H^{+}/K^{+} ATPase ===
Animals have a gastric hydrogen potassium ATPase or H^{+}/K^{+} ATPase that belongs to the P-type ATPase family and functions as an electroneutral proton pump. This pump is found in the plasma membrane of cells in the gastric mucosa and functions to acidify the stomach. This enzyme is a P2C ATPase, characterized by having a supporting beta-subunit, and is closely related to the Na^{+}/K^{+} ATPase.

== V-type proton ATPase ==
V-type proton ATPase (or V-ATPase) translocate protons into intracellular organelles other than mitochondria and chloroplasts, but in certain cell types they are also found in the plasma membrane. V-type ATPases acidify the lumen of the vacuole (hence the symbol 'V') of fungi and plants, and that of the lysosome in animal cells. Furthermore, they are found in endosomes, clathrin coated vesicles, hormone storage granules, secretory granules, Golgi vesicles and in the plasma membrane of a variety of animal cells. Like F-type ATPases, V-type ATPases are composed of multiple subunits and carry out rotary catalysis. The reaction cycle involves tight binding of ATP but proceeds without formation of a covalent phosphorylated intermediate. V-type ATPases are evolutionary related to F-type ATPases.

== F-type proton ATPase ==
F-type proton ATPase (or F-ATPase) typically operates as an ATP synthase that dissipates a proton gradient rather than generating one; i.e. protons flow in the reverse direction compared to V-type ATPases. In eubacteria, F-type ATPases are found in plasma membranes. In eukaryotes, they are found in the mitochondrial inner membranes and in chloroplast thylakoid membranes. Like V-type ATPases, F-type ATPases are composed of multiple subunits and carry out rotary catalysis. The reaction cycle involves tight binding of ATP but proceeds without formation of a covalent phosphorylated intermediate. F-type ATPases are evolutionary related to V-type ATPases.
