= Acantholytic dyskeratotic epidermal nevus =

- Other names: Linear Darier disease
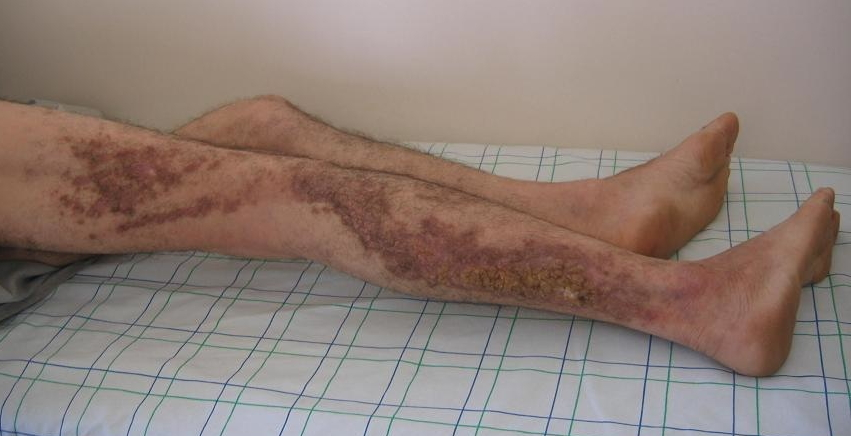
- Linear Darier disease
- Specialty: Dermatology

Acantholytic dyskeratotic epidermal nevus is a cutaneous condition identical to the generalized form of Darier's disease. "Acantholytic dyskeratotic epidermal nevus" is probably the same disorder.

== See also ==
- Acrokeratosis verruciformis
- List of cutaneous conditions
