= Keratodermia punctata =

Keratodermia punctata may refer to:

- Keratosis punctata palmaris et plantaris
- Keratosis punctata of the palmar creases
