= Nisterime acetate =

Chemical compound

Clinical data
- Other names: 2α-Chloro-5α-androstan-17β-ol-3-one O-(p-nitrophenyl)oxime 17β-acetate; 2α-Chloro-4,5α-dihydrotestosterone O-(p-nitrophenyl)oxime 17β-acetate; 2α-Chloro-3-(p-nitrophenoxy)imino-5α-androstan-17β-ol 17β-acetate
- Routes of administration: Oral

Identifiers
- IUPAC name: [(2R,3Z,5S,8R,9S,10S,13S,14S,17S)-2-Chloro-10,13-dimethyl-3-(4-nitrophenoxy)imino-1,2,4,5,6,7,8,9,11,12,14,15,16,17-tetradecahydrocyclopenta[a]phenanthren-17-yl] acetate
- CAS Number: 51354-31-5
- PubChem CID: 10006270
- ChemSpider: 16741388
- UNII: 7M1ALD652F
- KEGG: D05174
- ChEMBL: ChEMBL2104712
- CompTox Dashboard (EPA): DTXSID60965626

Chemical and physical data
- Formula: C_{27}H_{35}ClN_{2}O_{5}
- Molar mass: 503.04 g·mol^{−1}
- 3D model (JSmol): Interactive image
- SMILES: CC(=O)O[C@H]1CC[C@@H]2[C@@]1(CC[C@H]3[C@H]2CC[C@@H]4[C@@]3(C[C@H](/C(=N\OC5=CC=C(C=C5)[N+](=O)[O-])/C4)Cl)C)C
- InChI: InChI=1S/C27H35ClN2O5/c1-16(31)34-25-11-10-21-20-9-4-17-14-24(29-35-19-7-5-18(6-8-19)30(32)33)23(28)15-27(17,3)22(20)12-13-26(21,25)2/h5-8,17,20-23,25H,4,9-15H2,1-3H3/b29-24-/t17-,20-,21-,22-,23+,25-,26-,27-/m0/s1; Key:NNFGKFKPLQYECP-BYXNGVTISA-N

Nisterime acetate (USAN) (developmental code name ORF-9326), also known as 2α-chloro-4,5α-dihydrotestosterone O-(p-nitrophenyl)oxime 17β-acetate or as 2α-chloro-5α-androstan-17β-ol-3-one O-(p-nitrophenyl)oxime 17β-acetate, is a synthetic, orally active anabolic-androgenic steroid (AAS) and a derivative of dihydrotestosterone (DHT) that was developed as a postcoital contraceptive but was never marketed. It is an androgen ester – specifically, the C17α acetate ester of nisterime. Unlike antiprogestogens like mifepristone, nisterime acetate does not prevent implantation and instead induces embryo resorption as well as interrupts the post-implantation stage of pregnancy.

Nisterime acetate is described as an androgen by some sources. However, it has also been reported that the drug lacks hormonal activity in bioassays, including androgenic, estrogenic, or progestogenic activity (as well as antagonistic activity). This finding has been described as puzzling in light of the potent abortifacient activity of the drug in animals and it has been said that its mechanism of action remains unknown.

== See also ==
- Epostane
- Istaroxime
