= Darier's disease =

- Other names: Darier disease, Darier–White disease, Dyskeratosis follicularis, and Keratosis follicularis
- Specialty: Medical genetics
- Frequency: 0.005%

Darier's disease is a rare, autosomal dominant genetic skin disorder. It arises from mutations in the ATP2A2 gene which codes for the SERCA enzyme. Darier's disease was initially studied by dermatologists, but recent research shows that Darier’s has a whole-body effect, including cognitive (learning and intellectual) deficits, and mental health issues, particularly depression.

Mild forms of the disease are the most common, consisting of skin rashes that flare up under conditions such as high humidity, high stress, or tight-fitting clothes. Short stature, combined with poorly-formed fingernails that contain vertical striations, is diagnostic even for mild forms. Symptoms usually appear in late childhood or early adulthood between the ages of about 15 and 30 years and will vary over the lifespan in an intermittent pattern of relapse (flareups) and remit.

More severe cases are characterized by dark crusty patches on the skin that are mildly greasy and that can emit a strong odor. These patches, also known as keratotic papules, keratosis follicularis, or dyskeratosis follicularis, most often appear on the arms, chest, back and legs.

== Diagnosis and symptoms ==
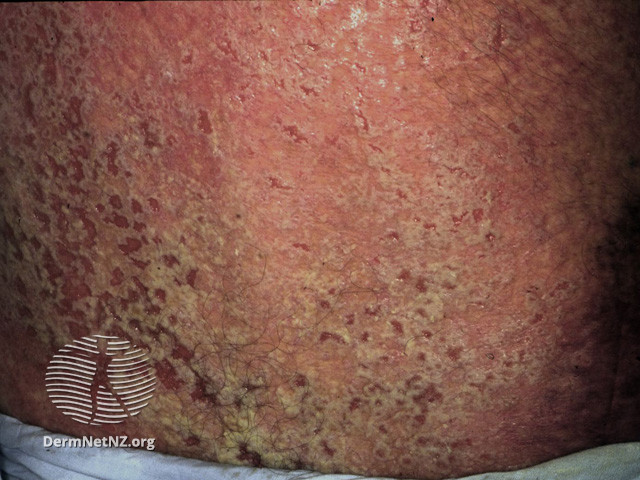
Rash associated with Darier's disease

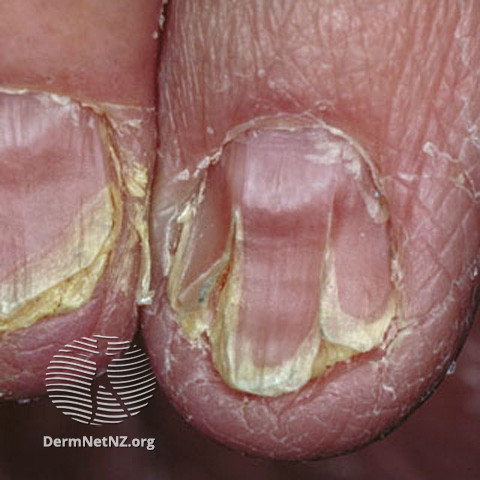
Malformed, weak nails with V-shaped chips, a common sign of Darier's disease

Diagnosis of Darier disease is often made by the appearance of the skin and nails, family history, and/or genetic testing for the mutation in the ATP2A2 gene. However, many individuals are never diagnosed because of the mildness of their symptoms. Mild cases present clinically as minor rashes (without odor) that can become exacerbated by heat, humidity, stress, and sunlight.

Clinical symptoms of the disease:

- Fragile or poorly formed fingernails with vertical striations (as distinct from nail biting). The malformed nails often have V-shaped nicks at the edge of the nail.
- Rash that covers many areas of the body, sometimes with weeping. In severe cases, it is often associated with an unpleasant odor. The rash can be aggravated by heat, humidity, and exposure to sunlight.
- Seborrhoeic areas. Areas where excess oil and sebum is released. Overall greasy or scaly skin either in the central chest and back or in the folds of the skin.
- Painful skin and itching (pruritus).

Other less common or less noticed symptoms are:

- Acrokeratosis verruciformis. Acrokeratosis (AKV) is characterized by several small wart-like and flat-topped bumps that line the skin on typically the hand and feet.
- Hypermelanotic macule. Dark patches on the skin that contain excess pigment.
- Subungual hyperkeratotic fragments. Thickened skin that is often discolored, under nails, on either hands or feet.

== Epidemiology and mental health ==
Worldwide prevalence of DD is estimated as between 1:30,000 and 1:100,000. Case studies have shown estimated prevalence by country to be 3.8:100,000 in Slovenia, 1:36,000 in north-east England, 1:30,000 in Scotland, and 1:100,000 in Denmark.

DD is seen in males and females equally. Symptoms typically arise between the ages of about 15 and 30, and vary over the lifetime in a relapse and remit pattern, in particular flareups that need to be managed. DD is inherited (genetic), and in particular can be traced in family groups in specific geographic localities.

Darier's disease is a non-communicable disorder, but secondary infections by bacteria and viruses can be spread to others.

DD was initially identified and studied by dermatologists (skin specialists) as a purely skin disease. Recent research however suggests DD has a whole-body effect, including cognitive and mental health issues.

A study of 100 British individuals diagnosed with Darier's disease reported that affected individuals display elevated frequencies of neuropsychiatric conditions. They had high lifetime rates for mood disorders (50%), including depression (30%), bipolar disorder (4%), suicidal thoughts (31%), and suicide attempts (13%).

A Swedish study of 770 individuals with DD showed a six-fold risk of being diagnosed with an intellectual disability, compared to matched Swedish population controls.

A study of 76 DD patients found that 41% reported learning difficulties, notably reading difficulties, and 74% reported a family history of learning disabilities. The full range of learning difficulties is not known.

== Etiology and genetics ==
Skin changes in Darier's disease are related to a type of nutritional vitamin A deficiency that is caused by genetic mutations (that is, DD is a systemic Vitamin A deficiency). The skin displays follicular dyskeratosis (degeneration of the skin in hair follicules), which reflects as hypovitaminosis A. The skin reactions are caused by an abnormality in the desmosome-keratin filament complex leading to a breakdown in cell adhesion.

Mutations in a single gene, ATP2A2, are the ultimate cause for the development of Darier's disease. It is an autosomal dominant disorder, that is, if one parent has DD, there is a 50% chance than a child will inherit DD. (Note: The gene ATP2A2 encodes the SERCA2 protein, which is a calcium pump localized to the membranes of the endoplasmic reticulum (ER) in nearly all cells and the sarcoplasmic reticulum (SR) in muscle cells. The ER is where protein processing and transport begins for proteins targeted for secretion. The SR is a specialized form of ER found in muscle cells that sequesters calcium, the regulated efflux of which into the cytosol stimulates muscle fiber contraction. Calcium acts as a second messenger in many cellular signal transduction pathways. SERCA2 is required for Ca2+ signaling in cells by removing nearly all Ca2+ ions from the cytoplasm and storing them in the ER/SR compartments. Darier's disease has an autosomal dominant pattern of inheritance. The mutation is inherited in an autosomal dominant pattern. This means that only one allele needs to be mutated in order to express the trait. This also means that someone who is born to one parent with DD has a 50% chance of inheriting the mutant allele and having the disease. Loss-of-function mutations typically display recessive inheritance while the gain-of-function or hyperactive function of proteins is characteristic of dominant mutations. The observation that only one mutated allele of the SERCA2 is sufficient to produce clinical symptoms suggests that proper "gene dosage" is necessary for maintaining Ca2+ homeostasis in cells. This means that two wild type copies of ATP2A2 are needed for proper cell function, which provides a logical basis for dominant phenotypes arising from loss-of-function alleles. Most ATP2A2 mutations are haploinsufficiency mutations, which means that only having only one functional copy of the functional gene results in a reduced level of protein expression that is not sufficient for wild type function for making enough of the coded protein for the cell to function properly. However, there is significant variability in disease severity in how the mutations are expressed even within families that have the same mutation. It is currently unclear in the current research why a reduction in SERCA2 expression/activity causes clinical symptoms restricted to the epidermis. One hypothesis is that other cell types express additional "back-up" Ca2+ pumps that can compensate for the reduced function or expression of the SERCA2 protein, while skin cells rely exclusively on the SERCA2 gene for calcium sequestration, meaning only they are affected by its reduction in expression.)

=== Subtypes of Darier's disease ===
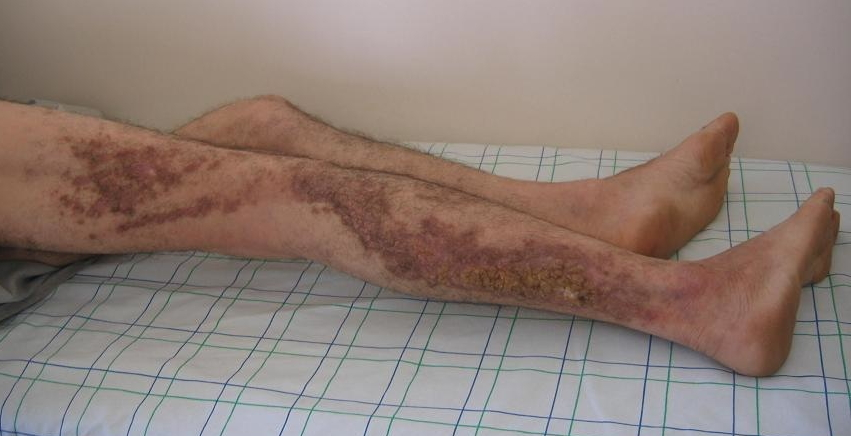
Linear Darier's disease

Subtypes of DD have been preliminarily suggested. A large number of mutant alleles of ATP2A2 have been identified in association with Darier's Disease. One study of 19 families and 6 sporadic cases found 24 specific, novel mutations associated with DD symptoms. This study reported a loose, imperfect correlation between the severity of ATP2A2 mutations with the severity of the condition. Significant variability in disease severity between members of the same family carrying the same mutation was also reported by this study, suggesting that genetic modifiers contribute to the phenotypic penetrance of certain mutations.

One subtype is linear Darier's disease. These cases result from somatic mutations to ATP2A2 in epidermal stem cells. Such individuals display phenotypic mosaicism, where the Darier's phenotype only affects the subset of epidermal tissue arising from the mutated progenitor cell. Somatic mutations are not inherited by the offspring of such individuals.

== Treatment ==
Two recent reviews of the medical literature have evaluated treatment strategies for DD. Management and treatment of Darier disease depends on the severity of the presented clinical symptoms. Mild symptoms are often treated with moisturising creams, and more severe symptoms with topical and oral retinol or other medications (oral medications having higher strength than topical equivalents), and medical procedures.

In many mild cases, DD can be managed by avoiding excessive perspiration and non-breathable and abrasive clothing (producing contact dermatitis), washing with salty water, and gentle abrasion with a gauze pad. This is supplemented by moisturising lotions and topical sunscreens. Most patients with Darier's disease can live normal healthy lives.

In more severe cases of DD, application of topical and oral medications, particularly retinoids, is prescribed. Hospitalisation may be required for seriously affected individuals who display frequent relapse and remit patterns and severe infections.

Rapid resolution of rash symptoms can be complicated by the increased vulnerability of affected skin surfaces to secondary bacterial or viral infections. Bacterial overgrowth can produce an odour. The main bacteria is epidermal Staphylococcus aureus. The main viruses are human papillomavirus (HPV) and herpes simplex virus (HSV). Infections are treated with antibiotics (for bacteria) and antiviral medications (for viruses).

Treatments that have evidence-based support (though not for all persons treated) can be classified into a number of groups. Because DD is a product of systemic Vitamin A deficiency, retinoids, chemical compounds (molecules) that are forms of (or related to) Vitamin A, are often recommended. Vitamin A acid compounds are often preferred as being less toxic than Vitamin A itself.

1. Topical medications: Retinoids (Adapalene, Tretinoin, Isotretinoin, Tazarotene gel). Topical retinoids help in the reduction of hyperkeratosis. They work by causing the skin cells in the top layers to die and be shed off.

- Vitamin A analogs (Calciptriol, Tacalitol).

2. Other topical medications.

- 5-fluouracil (5-FU), a chemotherapeutic agent.
- Benzoyal peroxide 5% gel. Antibacterial effect and removes dead skin, but long term use can cause skin irritation and other side effects, as well as bleaching of hair and clothes.
- Topical corticosteroids.

3. Oral medications: Retinoids (Acitretin, Isotretinoin). If symptoms are severe, oral retinoids have been proven to be very effective. However, there can be many adverse (and sometimes serious) side-effects associated with prolonged use.

- Systemic Vitamin A analogs.

4. Medical Procedures: Surgical excision and dermabrasion, laser procedures, radiation procedures (grenz-ray, X-ray, radiology).

- Dermabrasion. Removal of the top layer of skin to help smooth and stimulate new growth of the skin.
- Electrosurgery. Used to help stop bleeding and remove abnormal skin growths.

== Support groups ==
Further information on Darier's disease for patients is provided by support and advocacy groups.

- B.A.D. Patient Hub (British Association of Dermatologists). A list of numerous British support groups for specific skin diseases, including one for Darier’s disease.
- FIRST Skin Foundation (Foundation for Ichthyosis and Related Skin Disorders, Colmar, Pennsylvania). Ichthyosis refers to a group of skin disorders characterised by dry, scaly or thickened skin (mostly inherited, including DD).

== History ==
Darier's disease was first described by the French dermatologist Ferdinand-Jean Darier in the journal Annales de dermatologie et de syphilographie. Darier was a well-regarded dermatologist of the time who was the head of the medical department at the Hôpital Saint-Louis. Darier was an early proponent of histopathology, or the examination of samples of diseased flesh under a microscope to determine the cause of illnesses. Using this technique, he was able to uncover the origins of Darier's disease and others that also bear his name.

James Clarke White, a dermatologist at Harvard Medical School, characterized and published his observations on this dermatological disorder in the same year as Darier (1889), which is why DD is sometimes referred to as Darier-White disease.

=== Court case ===
In Singapore, a man escaped the death penalty for murder because of Darier's disease. Ong Teng Siew, a Malaysian chicken slaughterer aged 27, was charged with murdering an 82-year-old opium addict Ng Gee Seh in 1995. Ong was sentenced to death in August 1996 after the trial court found him guilty of murder, and while he was appealing his conviction, Ong was hospitalized for an outbreak of Darier's disease, which was previously undiagnosed. After his lawyer discovered that the disease had a causal link to psychiatric disorders, this new evidence enabled Ong to successfully apply for a re-trial. The court accepted that Ong now suffered from diminished responsibility as a result of Darier's disease, and therefore he was found guilty of a lesser offence of manslaughter and was re-sentenced to life imprisonment.

== See also ==
- Linear Darier disease
- List of cutaneous conditions
- Darier's sign
- Familial disseminated comedones without dyskeratosis

== Notes ==
=== Sources ===
- Cardoso, Camila Lopes; Freitas, Patrícia; Taveira, Luís Antônio de Assis; Consolaro, Alberto (2006). "Darier disease: case report with oral manifestations" (PDF). Medicina Oral Patologia Oral y Cirugia Bucal. 11 (E404-6): E404-6. eISSN 1698-6946. PMID 16878056.
