= Nisterime =

Chemical compound

Clinical data
- Other names: 2α-Chloro-5α-androstan-17β-ol-3-one 3-O-(p-nitrophenyl)oxime; 2α-Chloro-4,5α-dihydrotestosterone 3-O-(p-nitrophenyl)oxime; 2α-Chloro-3-(p-nitrophenoxy)imino-5α-androstan-17β-ol

Identifiers
- IUPAC name: (2R,3E,5S,8R,9S,10S,13S,14S,17S)-2-Chloro-10,13-dimethyl-3-(4-nitrophenoxy)imino-1,2,4,5,6,7,8,9,11,12,14,15,16,17-tetradecahydrocyclopenta[a]phenanthren-17-ol
- CAS Number: 51354-32-6
- PubChem CID: 5361123
- ChemSpider: 4514747
- UNII: ABF7S9U8W6

Chemical and physical data
- Formula: C_{25}H_{33}ClN_{2}O_{4}
- Molar mass: 461.00 g·mol^{−1}
- 3D model (JSmol): Interactive image
- SMILES: C[C@]12CC[C@H]3[C@H]([C@@H]1CC[C@@H]2O)CC[C@@H]4[C@@]3(C[C@H](/C(=N/OC5=CC=C(C=C5)[N+](=O)[O-])/C4)Cl)C
- InChI: InChI=1S/C25H33ClN2O4/c1-24-12-11-20-18(19(24)9-10-23(24)29)8-3-15-13-22(21(26)14-25(15,20)2)27-32-17-6-4-16(5-7-17)28(30)31/h4-7,15,18-21,23,29H,3,8-14H2,1-2H3/b27-22+/t15-,18-,19-,20-,21+,23-,24-,25-/m0/s1; Key:FSSASQYIDSGHST-BWYVWVFTSA-N

Nisterime (INN), also known as 2α-chloro-4,5α-dihydrotestosterone 3-O-(p-nitrophenyl)oxime or as 2α-chloro-5α-androstan-17β-ol-3-one 3-O-(p-nitrophenyl)oxime, is a synthetic anabolic-androgenic steroid (AAS) and a derivative of dihydrotestosterone (DHT) that was never marketed. The C17α acetate ester of nisterime, nisterime acetate (ORF-9326), also exists and was developed as a postcoital contraceptive but was similarly never marketed.

== See also ==
- Istaroxime
