= Murder of Ng Gee Seh =

1995 murder in Singapore

Ng Gee Seh
- Ng Gee Seh, the 82-year-old opium addict who was slashed to death
- Born: Ng Gee Seh c. 1913; Republic of China
- Died: 28 December 1995 (aged 82); North Bridge Road, Singapore
- Cause of death: Murdered
- Other name: Ng Ee Seng
- Occupations: Rag-and-bone man Opium dealer
- Known for: Murder victim
- Spouse: Unnamed wife
- Children: 1

On 28 December 1995, 82-year-old opium addict Ng Gee Seh (Chinese: 黄于成; pinyin: Huáng Yúchéng; Pe̍h-ōe-jī: N̂g Î-sêng), alias Ng Ee Seng, was found murdered in his flat at North Bridge Road, Singapore. Ng, who worked as a ragpicker, was slashed to death on the neck by his attacker, who surrendered himself days after the brutal killing. The Malaysian-born suspect, Ong Teng Siew (Chinese: 王廷守; pinyin: Wáng Tíngshǒu; Pe̍h-ōe-jī: Ông Têng-siú), stated that he was suffering from intoxication of alcohol and opium and was also provoked by alleged insults from Ng leading to his homicide.

Ong's defence was rejected and he was found guilty of murder and sentenced to death in August 1996. While pending his appeal against his conviction and sentence, Ong was found to be suffering from Darier's disease, a rare skin disorder which could also lead to psychiatric problems to those with the disease. A re-trial was granted in 1998, and Ong's sentence was commuted to life imprisonment after the courts agreed to downgrade Ong's murder conviction to manslaughter on the grounds of diminished responsibility.

== Murder ==
On 28 December 1995, at his rented flat in North Bridge Road, 82-year-old rag-and-bone man and opium addict Ng Gee Seh (alias Ng Ee Seng) was found dead with a gaping knife wound to his neck. Ng had lived in the flat for at least six years with his godson Pun Chun Wah (who was a Malaysian aged in his 50s) at the time he was killed, and it was a friend of Ng, Lau Chin Sing, who discovered the body and reported the case to the police. Some opium paraphernalia were also found in Ng's flat, indicating that Ng had not only smoked opium, but also sold opium from the flat. It was not the first time Ng became a victim of crime. Just four months before in August 1995, Goh Tin Luan, who posed as a government officer, had cheated Ng of S$11,000, and also targeted several other elderly victims. Goh was sentenced to seven years' preventive detention for cheating in November 1995, a month before Ng was murdered. Ng was survived by his 80-year-old wife, his only child, and a few grandchildren, who were all residing in China.

Dr Teo Eng Swee, the forensic pathologist, later certified that the slash wound was measured 15 cm deep and was caused by a knife, and it had cut through the gullet, several blood vessels and neck muscles, and it was sufficient in the ordinary course of nature to cause death due to it resulting in Ng dying from acute haemorrhage. According to Dr Teo, there were broken ribs in Ng's chest, suggesting that the murderer(s) had sat on the victim when slashing the victim's throat, and that Ng himself was also strangled prior to the fatal slashing.

The police classified the case as murder and the investigations, led by Inspector Zainudin Lee, were swiftly conducted. It was later found that a day before Ng was murdered, a Malaysian man named Ong Teng Siew had last came to Ng's flat to smoke opium twice. Ong was therefore considered as a prime suspect of the murder. On 2 January 1996, 27-year-old Ong, a native of Johor who was working as a chicken slaughterer in Singapore, surrendered himself after the police approached him at his workplace, after the police were notified of his return from Johor to Singapore for work. Ong was therefore charged with murder the next day, and Ong himself also confessed to slashing Ng to death.

== Trial of Ong Teng Siew ==
=== Court hearing and psychiatric evidence ===
Ong Teng Siew
- Ong Teng Siew, the chicken slaughter who was charged with murdering Ng Gee Seh
- Born: Ong Teng Siew; 1968 (age 57–58); Johor, Malaysia
- Occupation: Chicken slaughterer (former)
- Spouse: Chong An Nie
- Children: 2
- Status: Released
- Motive: Unknown
- Conviction: Manslaughter (one count)
- Criminal charges: Murder(one count)(1996)
- Penalty: Death(1996); commuted to life imprisonment (1998)

On 29 July 1996, Ong Teng Siew stood trial for the murder of Ng Gee Seh at the High Court. Wong Siew Hong and Chong Chee Hong were assigned to defend Ong, while Ng Cheng Thiam and Karen Loh were appointed to prosecute Ong for murder, and the trial was presided by Judicial Commissioner Amarjeet Singh.

While Ong did not deny murdering Ng, his defence was that his mental responsibility had been substantially impaired by intoxication of alcohol and opium, and he had been gravely provoked by the victim and therefore killed Ng in a moment of loss of self-control. According to Ong's confession, on the day of the murder, he had gone to Ng's flat per usual to consume opium, a routine he had adhered to since 1992. Ong, who had consumed two packets of opium prior to his visit at Ng's flat, and he went there to smoke opium again. During the session itself, Ong had also drank some strong Chinese wine (revealed to be tiger bone wine) before he fell asleep. Afterwards, according to Ong, he was awakened by Ng, who suddenly berated him for overstaying his welcome despite having purchased opium from him, and it sparked an argument between Ong and Ng, during which Ng allegedly used abusive and vulgar language against him and even insulted Ong's mother, and this caused Ong to be infuriated and therefore used a knife to slash Ng on the throat, resulting in his death. Ong claimed he only realized he killed Ng after regaining his senses at the sight and smell of blood.

Dr Lim Yun Chin, a consultant psychiatrist, was called to testify for the defence. Dr Lim testified that based on the level of alcohol and opium in Ong's blood, and his account of what happened, it was plausible that Ong was suffering from diminished responsibility as induced by alcohol intoxication and effects of opium consumption, and it affected his mental faculties at the time of the offence, and also rendered him reacting vehemently to the provocation given. However, Dr Tan Soo Teng, the prosecution's psychiatric expert, testified that Ong's mental state was not substantially impaired by the combination of drug and alcohol intoxication, and he was able to harness his self-control at the time of the offence. Dr Tan also described Ong as a short-tempered and violent person, citing instances of Ong having assaulted his wife and other people in outbursts of anger, and Ong had overreacted with violence and his response was out of proportion to the provocative language Ng had reportedly spewed against him.

=== Verdict ===
After a seven-day trial, Judicial Commissioner Amarjeet Singh delivered his verdict on 12 August 1996.

In his judgement, Judicial Commissioner Singh found that Ong's mental state was not substantially impaired as a result of alcohol intoxication and the effects of opium consumption. He also found that Ong could still exercise some self-control at the material time when he killed Ng, and he observed that Ong was evasive in his answers during the prosecution's cross-examination. Judicial Commissioner Singh also determined that the actions of Ong was out of proportion to the provocation given, and he had grossly overreacted to Ng's provocative remarks by brutally slashing the defenceless 82-year-old man to death, and this blatant manner of the murder showed that Ong had the intent to cause Ng's death. Based on this, Judicial Commissioner Singh decided that Ong's defences of diminished responsibility and sudden and grave provocation were ought to be rejected. The judge also found that Ong had not disputed the fact that he intentionally slashed the throat of Ng, such that the bodily injury inflicted was sufficient in the ordinary course of nature to cause death, and therefore his actions constituted as an act of murder under the law.

Therefore, Judicial Commissioner Singh found 28-year-old Ong Teng Siew guilty of murder, and sentenced him to death by hanging. Under Singaporean law, the death penalty was stipulated as the mandatory punishment for murder if found guilty. Ong expressed he would appeal against his conviction and sentence.

== Discovery of Ong's skin disease ==
In September 1996, while Ong Teng Siew was incarcerated on death row at Changi Prison and pending his appeal against his conviction and sentence, Ong suffered from a violent outbreak of a skin disease, sustaining red rashes and disfigurement on his body and face, and he was hospitalized at Changi Hospital for the disease. Ong was subsequently diagnosed with Darier's disease, a rare skin disorder that could cause disfiguring and red rashes on the skin, and it was also a hereditary disease that could be passed on from parent to child; Ong was suffering from this particular skin condition since age 14, and the disease itself was previously unspecified during the course of Ong's trial. This disease had re-emerged following the end of the trial due to Ong's distress at the possibility of entering the gallows for murdering Ng Gee Seh.

Based on this finding, Wong Siew Hong, Ong's defence lawyer, therefore conducted his research on whether this condition may have a causal link to Ong's psychiatric state. According to Wong, he made use of the Internet to search for information and inquired an overseas medical discussion group about the disease, and it took Wong four months before he received a reply from a doctor in Boston, who confirmed that Darier's disease could lead to various psychiatric disorders in terms of its severity, and with the new information and additional evidence Wong managed to gather after this new discovery, Wong applied for a re-trial for Ong, seeking to review his conviction based on the new evidence received.

Ong's then-ongoing appeal was thus adjourned in January 1997 in light of Ong's skin condition and pending a new psychiatric assessment for Ong's case. In September 1997, the Court of Appeal granted the defence's request to conduct a re-trial at the High Court.

== Ong's re-trial and reprieve ==
=== Re-trial and defence ===
On 23 February 1998, Ong Teng Siew returned to the High Court for a re-trial. Wong Siew Hong, assisted by Chua Eng Hui (who formerly represented Kwan Cin Cheng for killing his girlfriend), continued to represent Ong while the prosecution was once again led by Ng Cheng Thiam and Karen Loh. The re-trial was conducted before the original trial judge of Ong's case, Judicial Commissioner Amarjeet Singh.

When giving his testimony on the stand, Ong stated that he would often see hallucinations of ghosts and shadows trailing him wherever he went, and he said that on the date of the killing, he saw one of these shadows inside Ng Gee Seh's flat and he therefore slashed the "shadow", who turned out to be Ng after he regained his senses. Ong's wife Chong An Nie and several other family members also testified that Ong had often told them he would see ghosts from time to time and also displayed frequent outbursts of anger and violence. Dr Lim Yun Chin, the defence's psychiatric expert, returned with a new psychiatric report and testify during Ong's re-trial. He testified and confirmed that Darier's disease could cause psychiatric problems, and this caused Ong to have a psychotic episode when he attacked and killed Ng, and also diagnosed Ong with intermittent explosive disorder. Similarly, another psychiatrist, Dr Douglas Kong Sim Guan, also supported the defence's contention that Ong encountered a psychotic episode when he killed Ng, which was also influenced by the effects of opium and alcohol he consumed before the killing, and both Dr Kong and Dr Lim stated that Ong's mental responsibility had been substantially impaired as a result of Darier's disease. Ong's previous suicidal tendencies in his youth and before the killing, his inability to control his temper and his hallucinations were also cited to support the defence of diminished responsibility.

Dr Tan Soo Teng, the prosecution's psychiatric expert, was re-summoned to court to rebut the defence. He stated that Ong was violent and aggressive, and therefore, he was prescribed with chlorpromazine, also known as Largactil, to deal with his mood outbursts, aggression and violence. He also had the opinion that Ong had murdered Ng in a moment of extreme anger and violence, and was normally bad tempered enough to even assault his wife or acquaintances on previous occasions. However, during the defence's cross-examination, it was found that during the course of the trial, Ong had been prescribed a daily dose of 100 mg of chlorpromazine, which was four times the recommended dosage of the drug itself, and these were also administered during the moments when Ong reportedly hallucinated and attempted suicide.

Based on this information, Wong Siew Hong argued that these instances were solid proof that Ong had indeed suffered from diminished responsibility due to the effect which Darier's disease had on his mental state of mind, and he also argued that Dr Tan's disclosure of the drug dosage could only give credence that Ong was likely behaving under the effects of the drug during the trial, which had affected his responses to cross-examination and his demeanour in court. Arguing that his client had been "heavily doped" during his trial, Wong pointed out that this was grossly unfair to Ong because he should be in a state of mind where he required the best sense of concentration and alertness to testify and present his defence in court, especially since he faced a charge of murder that could potentially result in a death sentence, and he needed to save his life in such a situation. The defence's psychiatrists also expressed their concerns about Dr Tan's decision to prescribe the drug as it was not meant to soothe and calm a person's mind but only to treat psychiatric illnesses, and the effects of the drug would have caused Ong to unable to maintain the best mental state to undergo a trial, even if he was assessed to be fit to plead and stand trial.

On 10 March 1998, the re-trial was adjourned and sentencing was reserved till a later date.

=== Re-trial verdict ===
After a six-day long re-trial hearing, Judicial Commissioner Amarjeet Singh delivered his verdict on 17 April 1998.

In his judgement, Judicial Commissioner Singh accepted that Ong was indeed suffering from diminished responsibility at the time, as induced by Darier's disease, and such that the severity of the skin condition amounted to a substantial impairment of his mental responsibility at the time of the murder, and he therefore recommended that Ong's conviction of murder should be downgraded to a lesser offence of culpable homicide not amounting to murder, also known as manslaughter in Singapore's legal terms. Judicial Commissioner Singh also ruled that in view of the severity of his condition, Ong's suicidal tendencies and the danger he posed to himself and others, Ong should be sentenced to life in prison, the maximum punishment stipulated for manslaughter, and ordered that Ong's case be referred to the Court of Appeal for further review. With this decision, Ong had a potential chance to be spared the gallows should the appellate court agreed to lower his conviction and sentence.

Aside from recommending a reprieve for Ong, the trial judge took to focus on the fact that Ong had been heavily prescribed with chloropromizone in the course of his 1996 murder trial and the effects of the chlorpromazine overdose had affected his demeanour and manner of speaking in court, and he stated that it was unfair for a defendant like in Ong's case, because not only should they be considered fit to plead and stand trial, they need to focus fully on making their defence and effectively testify and respond during cross-examination in court. Judicial Commissioner Singh also sided with the defence and rejected the prosecution's attempt to paint Ong as a bad-tempered person who killed in a fit of anger, noting that the response of Ong to the provocation given by Ng was grossly excessive as a result of the psychiatric effects of Ong's skin condition.

=== Final verdict of the Court of Appeal ===
On 25 May 1998, the Court of Appeal's three-judge panel, consisting of Chief Justice Yong Pung How and two Judges of Appeal L P Thean (Thean Lip Ping) and M Karthigesu, issued their final verdict in Ong's case.

The Court of Appeal, having reviewed the original trial judge's findings, agreed that Ong's condition of Darier's disease was severe enough and it had substantially impaired his mental responsibility at the material time, referring to the moment when Ong killed Ng, and they accepted that the defence of diminished responsibility was sufficiently proven to warrant a conviction of manslaughter in Ong's case.

Although Ong's defence counsel asked the court to show leniency and sentence Ong to ten years' jail on behalf of his remorse and his wish to return to Malaysia, the three appellate judges sentenced Ong to life imprisonment per the original trial judge's recommendation, after finding that with both his skin disorder and psychiatric condition, Ong posed an inherent risk to the safety of himself and others and hence he should be confined in a controlled environment for as long as it was permissible by law to ensure that he adhere to his treatment and had his condition monitored effectively. CJ Yong even sarcastically asked Wong to be neighbours with Ong should he really think Ong was not an inherent danger to society and deserved ten years' jail, and he also commented it was sheer luck that Ong's life sentence would not be a natural life term but only 20 years. Despite so, Ong's third brother was relieved to hear that his younger brother had escaped the death penalty, and Ong himself was calm and collected, and clapped his hands in a prayer. His wife, two children and mother-in-law were in Kuala Lumpur and not present to hear the verdict.

By the order of Abdul Nasir Amer Hamsah's landmark appeal on 20 August 1997, life imprisonment is to be defined as a term of incarceration lasting the remainder of a convict's natural life, instead of the old definition of life imprisonment as 20 years in prison. The changes to the law was to be applied to future cases that took place after 20 August 1997. However, since Ong committed the offence of manslaughter on 28 December 1995, about one year and eight months before the landmark ruling, his life sentence was equivalent to 20 years' jail based on the previous legal definition.

== Aftermath ==
The case of Ong Teng Siew attracted a considerable amount of attention, due to the fact that the case was reopened and eventually ended with Ong's reprieve from the gallows based on information obtained from the Internet, which was less accessible back in the late 1990s due to the progress of technology during that period. Ong's former lawyer Wong Siew Hong (aged 35 in 1998), who was a self-professed tech-savvy lawyer, stated that it was a stab in the dark when he first inquired the Internet about the nature of Darier's disease, which allowed him to obtain information that were crucial to help Ong escape the gallows for murdering Ng Gee Seh, and he also expressed his satisfaction over the outcome. The case of Ong Teng Siew was presumably the first case where a capital case was re-opened for a re-trial based on information that came from the Internet, and also the possible first case where the death penalty was revoked based on information from the Internet.

About 11 years after the murder of Ng Gee Seh, True Files, a Singaporean crime show, re-enacted the case and aired it as the third episode of the show's fourth season on 16 April 2006. In this episode, the victim was addressed as Ng Ee Seng, his other identity, while the killer Ong Teng Siew, who was still in Changi Prison serving his life sentence at that point, was still addressed by his real name. Ong's former lawyer Wong Siew Hong, who was interviewed in the episode, told the producers of the show that Ong was truly remorseful of killing Ng (whom Ong regarded as a close friend), and that was the reason why Ong surrendered himself at first, and Ong himself did not take the original verdict of death well back in 1996. Wong stated that while the absence of motive and the presence of remorse did not affect the requirements to secure a murder conviction in Singapore, he was concerned about the fact that there was more to his client's case than what it appeared to be, which turned out to be correct as he discovered Ong's skin disease and this discovery would prove instrumental to help Ong escape the gallows. It was also mentioned that Ong was still undergoing treatment for his skin disease while behind bars. Dr Lim Yun Chin, the psychiatrist who assessed Ong, was also interviewed to speak more about Darier's disease and its implications on those diagnosed with it.

Ong's life sentence had been backdated to his date of arrest in January 1996; if he maintained good behaviour, Ong would be granted an early release on parole after completing at least two-thirds of his sentence (equivalent to 13 years and four months). Since 2016, Ong was released from jail, and presumably returned to Malaysia.

== See also ==
- Life imprisonment in Singapore
- Capital punishment in Singapore
- List of major crimes in Singapore
