= SERCA =

Calcium ATPase-type P-ATPase

SERCA (sarcoplasmic/endoplasmic reticulum Ca^{2+}-ATPase or SR Ca^{2+}-ATPase) is a membrane protein that transports calcium from the cytosol into the sarcoplasmic reticulum (SR) of muscle cells. The SR is a structure which stores calcium in muscle cells, similar to the smooth endoplasmic reticulum of other cells. SERCA is a calcium ATPase-type P-ATPase. It uses energy from ATP to actively transport calcium ions across the SR membrane.

== Function ==
SERCA is a P-type ATPase. It resides in the sarcoplasmic reticulum (SR) within myocytes. It is a Ca^{2+} ATPase that transfers Ca^{2+} from the cytosol of the cell to the lumen of the SR. This uses energy from ATP hydrolysis during muscle relaxation.

There are 3 major domains on the cytoplasmic face of SERCA: the phosphorylation and nucleotide-binding domains, which form the catalytic site, and the actuator domain, which is involved in the transmission of major conformational changes.

In addition to its calcium-transporting functions, SERCA1 generates heat in brown adipose tissue and in skeletal muscles. Along with the heat it naturally produces due to its inefficiency in pumping Ca^{2+} ions, when it binds to a regulator called sarcolipin it stops pumping and functions solely as an ATP hydrolase. This mechanism of thermogenesis is widespread in mammals and in endothermic fishes.

== Regulation ==
The rate at which SERCA moves Ca^{2+} across the SR membrane can be controlled by the regulatory protein phospholamban (PLB/PLN). SERCA is not as active when PLB is bound to it. Increased β-adrenergic stimulation reduces the association between SERCA and PLB by the phosphorylation of PLB by PKA. When PLB is associated with SERCA, the rate of Ca^{2+} movement is reduced; upon dissociation of PLB, Ca^{2+} movement increases.

Activity regulation of SERCA can also involve phosphorylation of SERCA itself by interaction with GSK3β. Phosphorylation of SERCA2a at S663 was shown to reduce SERCA2a activity.

Another protein, calsequestrin, binds calcium within the SR and helps to reduce the concentration of free calcium within the SR, which assists SERCA so that it does not have to pump against such a high concentration gradient. The SR has a much higher concentration of Ca^{2+} (10,000x) inside when compared to the cytoplasmic Ca^{2+} concentration. SERCA2 can be regulated by microRNAs, for instance miR-25 suppresses SERCA2 in heart failure.

For experimental purposes, SERCA can be inhibited by thapsigargin and induced by istaroxime.

SERCA function is upregulated in the skeletal muscle of rabbits and in rodent myocardium by thyroid hormones. This mechanism may contribute to the proarrhythmogenic effect of thyrotoxicosis.

== Paralogs ==
There are 3 major paralogs, SERCA1-3, which are expressed at various levels in different cell types.

- ATP2A1 – SERCA1
- ATP2A2 – SERCA2
- ATP2A3 – SERCA3

There are additional post-translational isoforms of both SERCA2 and SERCA3, which serve to introduce the possibility of cell-type-specific Ca^{2+}-reuptake responses as well as increasing the overall complexity of the Ca^{2+} signaling mechanism.
