= Acrokeratosis verruciformis =

- Other names: Acrokeratosis verruciformis of Hopf
- Acrokeratosis verruciformis has an autosomal dominant pattern of inheritance
- Specialty: Medical genetics

Acrokeratosis verruciformis is a rare autosomal dominant disorder appearing at birth or in early childhood, characterized by skin lesions that are small, verrucous, flat papules resembling warts along with palmoplantar punctate keratoses and pits. However sporadic forms, whose less than 10 cases have been reported, presents at a later age, usually after the first decade and generally lack palmoplantar keratoses. Whether acrokeratosis verruciformis and Darier disease are related or distinct entities has been controversial, like Darier's disease, it is associated with defects in the ATP2A2 gene. however the specific mutations found in the ATP2A2 gene in acrokeratosis verruciformis have never been found in Darier's disease.

== Signs and symptoms ==
Clinical signs of acrokeratosis include verrucous plaques and flat-topped, polygonal papules. The lesions range in hue from brown to skin tone, and their friction might cause vesicles. The backs of the hands and feet's proximal and distal interphalangeal joints are typically where the lesions are seen. Lesions are less common and only occasionally seen on other body parts. The frontal scalp, flexures, and oral mucosa are not affected by the condition. On the palms and soles, punctate keratosis is another symptom of the illness. Changes to the nails, such as thickening of the nail plate, leukonychia, longitudinal ridges, and nicks in the free edges, are often noted.

== Causes ==
Acrokeratosis verruciformis is caused by mutations in the ATP2A2 gene and is inherited in an autosomal dominant fashion.

== Diagnosis ==
The diagnosis is established by histological characteristics such as acanthosis, hyperkeratosis, hypergranulosis without parakeratosis, and papillomatosis, which are limited epidermal elevations referred to as "church spires."

== Treatment ==
Superficial ablation is currently the only effective treatment available.

== See also ==
- List of cutaneous conditions
- List of genes mutated in cutaneous conditions
