= Sarcolipin =

Protein-coding gene in the species Homo sapiens

SLN
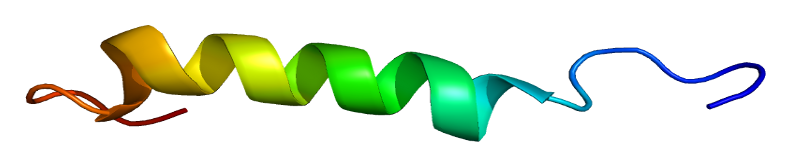

Identifiers
- Aliases: SLN, sarcolipin
- External IDs: OMIM: 602203; GeneCards: SLN
Available structures
PDB	Human UniProt search: PDBe RCSB
PDB	List of PDB id codes 1JDM

Gene location (Human)
Chr.	Chromosome 11 (human)
Band	11q22.3	Start	107,707,378 bp
Band	11q22.3	End	107,719,693 bp
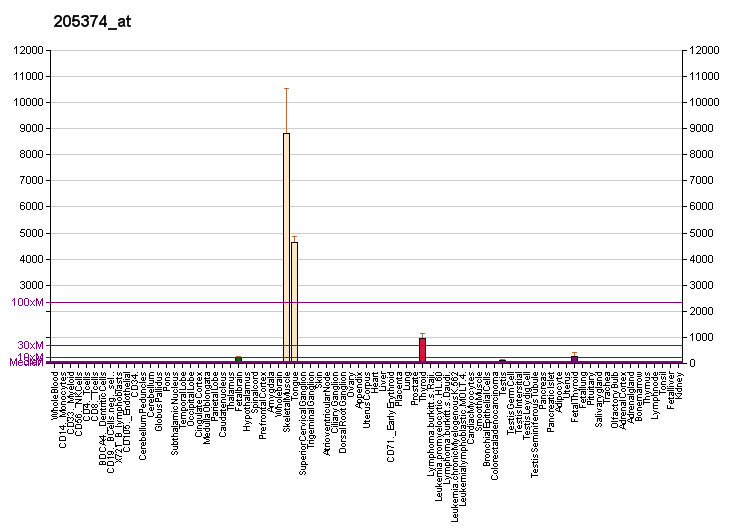
RNA expression pattern
Bgee	Human / Mouse (ortholog); Top expressed in: thoracic diaphragm; triceps brachii muscle; glutes; biceps brachii; Skeletal muscle tissue of biceps brachii; Skeletal muscle tissue of rectus abdominis; muscle of thigh; quadriceps femoris muscle; vastus lateralis muscle; body of tongue / n/a; More reference expression data
BioGPS	More reference expression data
Gene ontology
Molecular function	ATPase binding; enzyme inhibitor activity; enzyme regulator activity; protein binding
Cellular component	integral component of membrane; endoplasmic reticulum membrane; membrane; endoplasmic reticulum; sarcoplasmic reticulum membrane; sarcoplasmic reticulum
Biological process	positive regulation of protein depolymerization; negative regulation of protein-containing complex disassembly; negative regulation of calcium ion binding; regulation of calcium ion transport; negative regulation of catalytic activity; negative regulation of calcium ion transmembrane transporter activity; calcium ion transport; negative regulation of calcium ion import; sarcoplasmic reticulum calcium ion transport; regulation of relaxation of muscle; regulation of ATPase-coupled calcium transmembrane transporter activity; positive regulation of cold-induced thermogenesis
Sources:Amigo / QuickGO
Orthologs
Databases	NCBI: entry; OMA: entry
Species	Human	Mouse
Entrez	6588	n/a
Ensembl	ENSG00000170290	n/a
UniProt	O00631	n/a
RefSeq (mRNA)	NM_003063	n/a
RefSeq (protein)	NP_003054	n/a
Location (UCSC)	Chr 11: 107.71 – 107.72 Mb	n/a
PubMed search		n/a
- Wikidata
View/Edit Human

Sarcolipin is a micropeptide protein that in humans is encoded by the SLN gene.

== Function ==
Sarcoplasmic reticulum Ca^{2+}-ATPases are transmembrane proteins that catalyze the ATP-dependent transport of Ca^{2+} from the cytosol into the lumen of the sarcoplasmic reticulum in muscle cells. The SLN gene encodes a small transmembrane proteolipid that regulates several sarcoplasmic reticulum Ca^{2+}-ATPases by reducing the accumulation of Ca^{2+} in the sarcoplasmic reticulum without affecting the rate of ATP hydrolysis.

Ablation of sarcolipin increases atrial Ca^{2+} transient amplitudes and enhanced atrial contractility. Furthermore, atria from sarcolipin-null mice have blunted response to isoproterenol stimulation, implicating sarcolipin as a mediator of beta-adrenergic responses in atria.

Sarcolipin is an important mediator of muscle based non shivering thermogenesis (NST). It causes the sarcoplasmic reticulum Ca^{2+}-ATPases to stop pumping Ca^{2+} ions but continue futilely hydrolysing ATP, thus releasing the energy as heat. Sarcolipin mediated heat production is very important for many organisms to maintain a warm body. In mammals thermogenesis by skeletal muscles is complemented by thermogenesis in the brown adipose tissue and beige adipose tissue. Sarcolipin mediated heat production in contractile muscles helps endothermic fish like the opah heat its body. Some fishes like the billfishes have a specialised brain heater tissue that is derived from muscles that cannot contract but specialise in producing heat using sarcolipin.

== Interactions ==
Sarcolipin has been shown to interact with PLN and ATP2A1.
