= Familial disseminated comedones without dyskeratosis =

Skin disorder from a rare gene mutation

- This condition is inherited via an autosomal dominant manner
- Specialty: Dermatology

Familial disseminated comedones without dyskeratosis (FDCWD) is a rare autosomal dominant skin disorder characterized by the presence of numerous comedones (blackheads and whiteheads) on the face, trunk, and extremities. The comedones are typically asymptomatic and do not lead to scarring. The disorder is thought to be caused by a mutation in the gene encoding the protein involucrin.

The first case of FDCWD was reported in 1972. Since then, there have been approximately 100 additional cases reported in the literature. The disorder appears to be more common in people of Asian descent.

The diagnosis of FDCWD is made clinically. There is no specific laboratory test or biopsy finding that is diagnostic of the disorder. The differential diagnosis includes other disorders that can cause comedones, such as acne vulgaris, familial dyskeratotic comedones, and Darier-White disease.

There is no cure for FDCWD. Treatment is aimed at controlling the comedones and preventing scarring. Treatment options include topical retinoids, oral isotretinoin, and chemical peels.

The prognosis for FDCWD is good. The comedones typically do not worsen over time and do not lead to any serious health problems.

== Symptoms and signs ==
The most common symptom of FDCWD is the presence of numerous comedones on the face, trunk, and extremities. The comedones can be black or white and are typically asymptomatic. However, some people may experience mild itching or irritation.

In some cases, FDCWD can be associated with other symptoms, such as:

- Acne vulgaris
- Hyperkeratosis (thickening of the skin)
- Follicular papules and pustules
- Scarring

== Causes ==
FDCWD is caused by a mutation in the gene encoding the protein involucrin. Involucrin is a protein that is important for the formation of the skin's outer layer, the epidermis. The mutation in the involucrin gene causes the skin to produce an abnormal form of involucrin, which disrupts the normal formation of the epidermis. This leads to the formation of comedones.

== Diagnosis ==
The diagnosis of FDCWD is made clinically. There is no specific laboratory test or biopsy finding that is diagnostic of the disorder.

=== Differential diagnosis ===
The DDx includes other disorders that can cause comedones, such as:

- Acne vulgaris
- Familial dyskeratotic comedones
- Darier-White disease

== Treatment ==
Isotretinoin

There is no cure for FDCWD. Treatment is aimed at controlling the comedones and preventing scarring. Treatment options include:

- Topical retinoids
- Oral isotretinoin
- Chemical peels

== Prognosis ==
The prognosis for FDCWD is good. The comedones typically do not worsen over time and do not lead to any serious health problems.
