= ATP2A1 =

Protein-coding gene in the species Homo sapiens

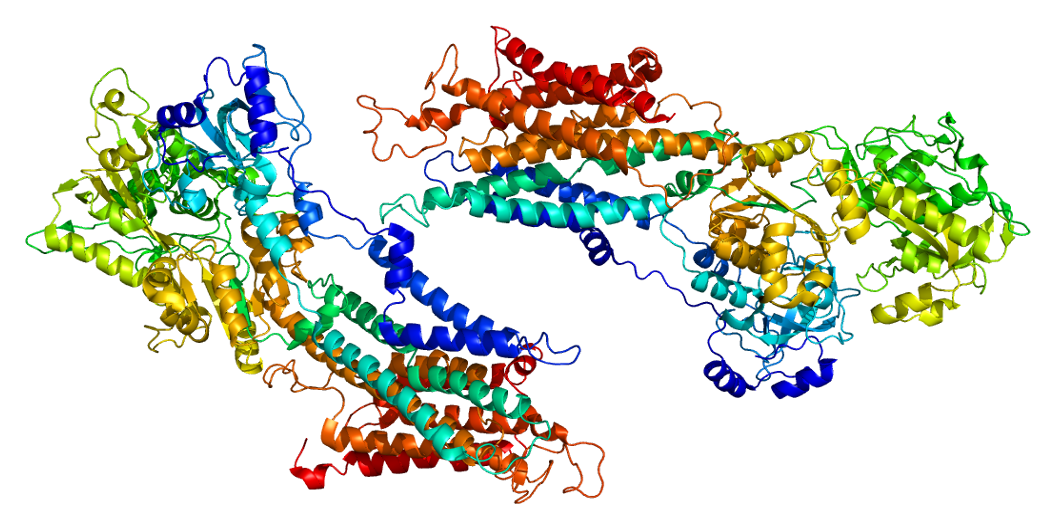

Identifiers
- Aliases: ATP2A1, ATP2A, SERCA1, ATPase sarcoplasmic/endoplasmic reticulum Ca2+ transporting 1
- External IDs: OMIM: 108730; MGI: 105058; GeneCards: ATP2A1
Enzyme activity
EC #	BRENDA	ExPASy	KEGG	MetaCyc
7.2.2.10	↗	↗	↗	↗

Gene location (Human)
Chr.	Chromosome 16 (human)
Band	16p11.2	Start	28,878,405 bp
Band	16p11.2	End	28,904,466 bp

Gene location (Mouse)
Chr.	Chromosome 7 (mouse)
Band	7 F3|7 69.04 cM	Start	126,045,030 bp
Band	7 F3|7 69.04 cM	End	126,062,280 bp
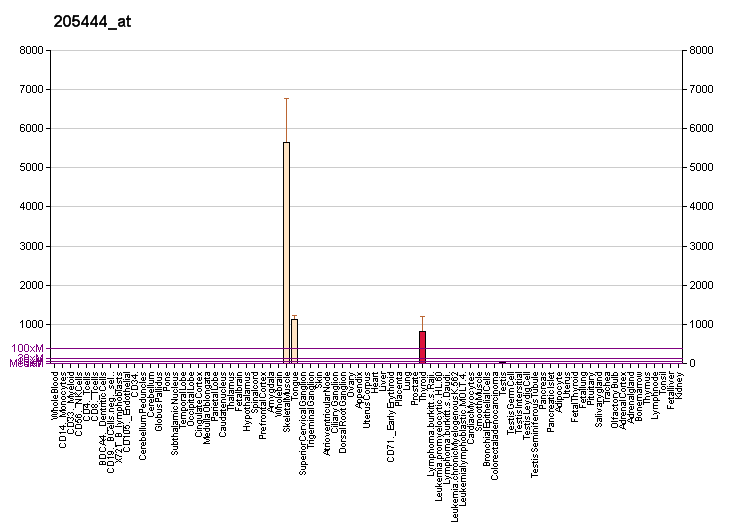
RNA expression pattern
Bgee	Human / Mouse (ortholog); Top expressed in: muscle of thigh; Skeletal muscle tissue of rectus abdominis; thoracic diaphragm; Skeletal muscle tissue of biceps brachii; vastus lateralis muscle; triceps brachii muscle; gastrocnemius muscle; body of tongue; glutes; deltoid muscle / Top expressed in: ankle; triceps brachii muscle; temporal muscle; sternocleidomastoid muscle; digastric muscle; muscle of thigh; vastus lateralis muscle; extensor digitorum longus muscle; tibialis anterior muscle; medial head of gastrocnemius muscle; More reference expression data
BioGPS	More reference expression data
Gene ontology
Molecular function	nucleotide binding; calcium ion binding; protein homodimerization activity; metal ion binding; protein binding; hydrolase activity; ATP binding; P-type calcium transporter activity; ATPase activity; P-type proton-exporting transporter activity
Cellular component	integral component of membrane; endoplasmic reticulum membrane; membrane; I band; calcium channel complex; H zone; sarcoplasmic reticulum; platelet dense tubular network membrane; endoplasmic reticulum; sarcoplasmic reticulum membrane; perinuclear region of cytoplasm; endoplasmic reticulum-Golgi intermediate compartment; mitochondrion
Biological process	regulation of cardiac conduction; positive regulation of fast-twitch skeletal muscle fiber contraction; negative regulation of striated muscle contraction; calcium ion import; positive regulation of endoplasmic reticulum calcium ion concentration; ion transport; response to endoplasmic reticulum stress; maintenance of mitochondrion location; ion transmembrane transport; intrinsic apoptotic signaling pathway in response to endoplasmic reticulum stress; regulation of striated muscle contraction; apoptotic mitochondrial changes; relaxation of skeletal muscle; negative regulation of endoplasmic reticulum calcium ion concentration; positive regulation of mitochondrial calcium ion concentration; calcium ion transport; calcium ion transmembrane transport; cellular calcium ion homeostasis; proton transmembrane transport; calcium ion import into sarcoplasmic reticulum; positive regulation of cardiac muscle cell contraction; positive regulation of ATPase-coupled calcium transmembrane transporter activity; positive regulation of calcium ion import into sarcoplasmic reticulum
Sources:Amigo / QuickGO
Orthologs
Databases	NCBI: entry; OMA: entry
Species	Human	Mouse
Entrez	487	11937
Ensembl	ENSG00000196296	ENSMUSG00000030730
UniProt	O14983	Q8R429
RefSeq (mRNA)	NM_173201; NM_001286075; NM_004320	NM_007504
RefSeq (protein)	NP_001273004; NP_004311; NP_775293	NP_031530
Location (UCSC)	Chr 16: 28.88 – 28.9 Mb	Chr 7: 126.05 – 126.06 Mb
PubMed search
- Wikidata
View/Edit Human	View/Edit Mouse

Sarcoplasmic/endoplasmic reticulum calcium ATPase 1 (SERCA1) also known as Calcium pump 1, is an enzyme that in humans is encoded by the ATP2A1 gene.

== Function ==
This gene encodes one of the SERCA Ca^{2+}-ATPases, which are intracellular pumps located in the sarcoplasmic or endoplasmic reticula of muscle cells. This enzyme catalyzes the hydrolysis of ATP coupled with the translocation of calcium from the cytosol to the sarcoplasmic reticulum lumen, and is involved in muscular excitation and contraction.

== Clinical significance ==
Mutations in this gene cause some autosomal recessive forms of Brody disease, characterized by increasing impairment of muscular relaxation during exercise. Alternative splicing results in two transcript variants encoding different isoforms. Alternative splicing of ATP2A1 is also implicated in myotonic dystrophy type 1.

ATP2A1 SERCA pumps were very strongly down regulated in amyotrophic lateral sclerosis.

== Interactions ==
ATP2A1 has been shown to interact with:

- SLN, and
- PLN.
