= ATP2A2 =

Mammalian protein found in Homo sapiens

Identifiers
- Aliases: ATP2A2, ATP2B, DAR, DD, SERCA2, ATPase sarcoplasmic/endoplasmic reticulum Ca2+ transporting 2
- External IDs: OMIM: 108740; MGI: 88110; GeneCards: ATP2A2
Enzyme activity
EC #	BRENDA	ExPASy	KEGG	MetaCyc
7.2.2.10	↗	↗	↗	↗

Gene location (Human)
Chr.	Chromosome 12 (human)
Band	12q24.11	Start	110,280,756 bp
Band	12q24.11	End	110,351,093 bp

Gene location (Mouse)
Chr.	Chromosome 5 (mouse)
Band	5 62.38 cM|5 F	Start	122,591,576 bp
Band	5 62.38 cM|5 F	End	122,640,288 bp
RNA expression pattern
Bgee	Human / Mouse (ortholog); Top expressed in: Skeletal muscle tissue of biceps brachii; right ventricle; body of tongue; triceps brachii muscle; glutes; Skeletal muscle tissue of rectus abdominis; thoracic diaphragm; right auricle of heart; vena cava; lateral nuclear group of thalamus / Top expressed in: myocardium of ventricle; atrium; cardiac muscles; cardiac muscle tissue of left ventricle; interventricular septum; medial dorsal nucleus; atrioventricular valve; soleus muscle; right ventricle; lateral geniculate nucleus; More reference expression data
BioGPS	n/a
Gene ontology
Molecular function	nucleotide binding; calcium ion binding; S100 protein binding; P-type calcium transporter activity involved in regulation of cardiac muscle cell membrane potential; metal ion binding; protein binding; enzyme binding; hydrolase activity; ATP binding; P-type calcium transporter activity; protein C-terminus binding; lutropin-choriogonadotropic hormone receptor binding; P-type proton-exporting transporter activity
Cellular component	integral component of membrane; endoplasmic reticulum membrane; membrane; vesicle membrane; intercalated disc; extrinsic component of cytoplasmic side of plasma membrane; integral component of plasma membrane; sarcoplasmic reticulum; ribbon synapse; longitudinal sarcoplasmic reticulum; platelet dense tubular network membrane; endoplasmic reticulum; sarcoplasmic reticulum membrane; perinuclear region of cytoplasm; calcium ion-transporting ATPase complex; nucleoplasm; protein-containing complex; apical ectoplasmic specialization; plasma membrane bounded cell projection
Biological process	regulation of cardiac conduction; regulation of cardiac muscle contraction by calcium ion signaling; regulation of calcium ion-dependent exocytosis of neurotransmitter; negative regulation of heart contraction; transition between fast and slow fiber; regulation of the force of heart contraction; regulation of cardiac muscle cell action potential involved in regulation of contraction; cellular calcium ion homeostasis; positive regulation of endoplasmic reticulum calcium ion concentration; ion transport; endoplasmic reticulum calcium ion homeostasis; ER-nucleus signaling pathway; organelle organization; positive regulation of heart rate; ion transmembrane transport; cell adhesion; calcium ion transmembrane transport; sarcoplasmic reticulum calcium ion transport; calcium ion transport from cytosol to endoplasmic reticulum; epidermis development; cellular response to oxidative stress; calcium ion import into sarcoplasmic reticulum; regulation of cardiac muscle cell membrane potential; relaxation of cardiac muscle; calcium ion transport; T-tubule organization; cardiac muscle hypertrophy in response to stress; response to endoplasmic reticulum stress; response to lipopolysaccharide; skeletal muscle contraction; cellular response to heat; proton transmembrane transport
Sources:Amigo / QuickGO
Orthologs
Databases	NCBI: entry; OMA: entry
Species	Human	Mouse
Entrez	488	11938
Ensembl	ENSG00000174437	ENSMUSG00000029467
UniProt	P16615	O55143
RefSeq (mRNA)	NM_001135765; NM_001681; NM_170665	NM_001110140; NM_009722
RefSeq (protein)	NP_001672; NP_733765	NP_001103610; NP_033852
Location (UCSC)	Chr 12: 110.28 – 110.35 Mb	Chr 5: 122.59 – 122.64 Mb
PubMed search
- Wikidata
View/Edit Human	View/Edit Mouse

ATP2A2 also known as sarcoplasmic/endoplasmic reticulum calcium ATPase 2 (SERCA2) is an ATPase associated with Darier's disease and acrokeratosis verruciformis.

This gene encodes one of the SERCA Ca(2+)-ATPases, which are intracellular pumps located in the sarcoplasmic or endoplasmic reticula of muscle cells. This enzyme catalyzes the hydrolysis of ATP coupled with the translocation of calcium from the cytosol to the sarcoplasmic reticulum lumen, and is involved in calcium sequestration associated with muscular excitation and contraction. Alternative splicing results in multiple transcript variants encoding different isoforms.
