= Istaroxime =

Chemical compound

Clinical data
- Other names: (3Z,5α)-3-[(2-Aminoethoxy)imino]androstane-6,17-dione

Legal status
- Legal status: Investigational

Identifiers
- IUPAC name: (3E,5S,8R,9S,10R,13S,14S)-3-(2-aminoethoxyimino)-10,13-dimethyl-1,2,4,5,7,8,9,11,12,14,15,16-dodecahydrocyclopenta[a]phenanthrene-6,17-dione
- CAS Number: 203737-93-3
- PubChem CID: 9841834
- DrugBank: DB06157
- ChemSpider: 28521583
- UNII: W40687GO3S
- ChEMBL: ChEMBL2093999
- CompTox Dashboard (EPA): DTXSID20870222

Chemical and physical data
- Formula: C_{21}H_{32}N_{2}O_{3}
- Molar mass: 360.498 g·mol^{−1}
- 3D model (JSmol): Interactive image
- SMILES: C[C@]12CCC(=NOCCN)C[C@@H]1C(=O)C[C@@H]3[C@@H]2CC[C@]4([C@H]3CCC4=O)C
- InChI: InChI=1S/C21H32N2O3/c1-20-7-5-13(23-26-10-9-22)11-17(20)18(24)12-14-15-3-4-19(25)21(15,2)8-6-16(14)20/h14-17H,3-12,22H2,1-2H3/t14-,15-,16-,17+,20+,21-/m0/s1; Key:MPYLDWFDPHRTEG-IFVNMTGRSA-N

Istaroxime is an investigational drug under development for treatment of acute decompensated heart failure

Originally patented and developed by Sigma-Tau, it was sold to CVie Therapeutics in July 2012.

== Heart failure ==
Istaroxime is a treatment for both systolic and diastolic heart failure.

- Systolic heart failure is characterized by impaired ventricular emptying, caused by reduced contractility.
- Diastolic dysfunction is defined by defective ventricular filling, caused by the heart's inability to properly relax between beats.

Intracellular calcium fluxes regulate both contraction and relaxation. Cardiac muscle cells from patients with heart failure show smaller amounts of peak calcium in their cytoplasm during contraction, and slower removal., The mishandling of intracellular calcium is often due to problems in the cells’ ability to mediate calcium influx, and sequestration of calcium back in the sarcoplasmic reticulum.,

== Mechanism of action ==
Istaroxime is a positive inotropic agent that mediates its action through inhibition of sodium/potassium adenosine triphosphatase (Na+/K+ ATPase). Na+/K+ ATPase inhibition increases intracellular sodium levels, which reverses the driving force of the sodium/calcium exchanger, inhibiting calcium extrusion and possibly facilitating calcium entry.,

Additionally, istaroxime increases intracellular calcium by improving the efficacy by which intracellular calcium triggers sarcoplasmic reticulum calcium release, and by accelerating the inactivation state of L-type calcium channels, which allow for calcium influx. Together the changes in calcium handling increase cell contraction.

Istaroxime also enhances the heart's relaxation phase by increasing the rate of intracellular calcium sequestration by Sarco/endoplasmic Reticulum Calcium ATPase, isotype 2a (SERCA2a). SERCa2a is inhibited by phospholamban and higher phospholamban-to-SERCA2a ratios cause SERCA inhibition and impaired relaxation. Istaroxime reduces SERCA2a-phospholamban interaction, and increases SERCA2a affinity for cytosolic calcium. Studies on failing human heart tissue show that istaroxime increases SERCA2a activity up to 67%.

== Clinical use ==
Clinical trials show that istaroxime improves ejection fraction, stroke volume and systolic blood pressure, while also enhancing ventricular filling. The drug also reduces heart rate and ventricular diastolic stiffness. Contrary to available inotropic therapies, istaroxime may permit cytosolic calcium accumulation while avoiding a proarrhythmic state.

Proposed mechanisms for istaroxime's antiarrhythmic effect include a suppression of the transient inward calcium current directly involved in the production of delayed after-depolarizations and improved calcium sequestration due to SERCA2a stimulation. SERCA down-regulation in the failing myocardium might sensitize patients to the detrimental effect of other currently used positive inotropes. Istaroxime's lusitropic effect facilitates its wider margin of safety, as patients can receive higher doses without signs of arrhythmias.
