= Phospholamban =

Mammalian protein found in Homo sapiens

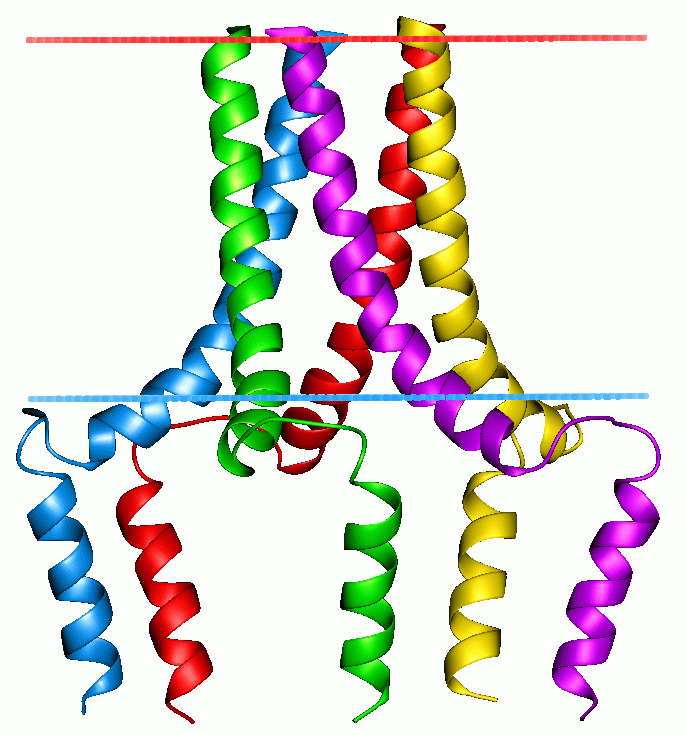
- Phospholamban pentamer

Identifiers
- Symbol: Phospholamban
- Pfam: PF04272
- InterPro: IPR005984
- SCOP2: 1fjk / SCOPe / SUPFAM
- TCDB: 1.A.50
- OPM superfamily: 62
- OPM protein: 1zll
- Membranome: 383
Available protein structures:
- PDB: IPR005984 PF04272 (ECOD; PDBsum)
- AlphaFold: IPR005984; PF04272

PLN
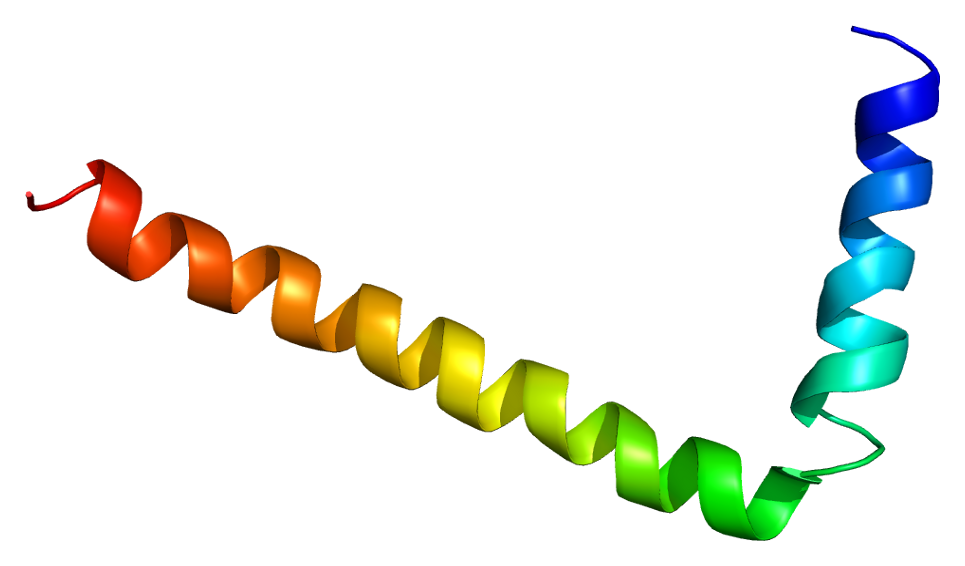

Identifiers
- Aliases: PLN, CMD1P, CMH18, PLB, phospholamban
- External IDs: OMIM: 172405; MGI: 97622; GeneCards: PLN
Available structures
PDB	Ortholog search: PDBe RCSB
PDB	List of PDB id codes 1PLP, 1ZLL, 2HYN

Gene location (Human)
Chr.	Chromosome 6 (human)
Band	6q22.31	Start	118,548,296 bp
Band	6q22.31	End	118,561,716 bp

Gene location (Mouse)
Chr.	Chromosome 10 (mouse)
Band	10|10 B3	Start	53,213,763 bp
Band	10|10 B3	End	53,222,083 bp
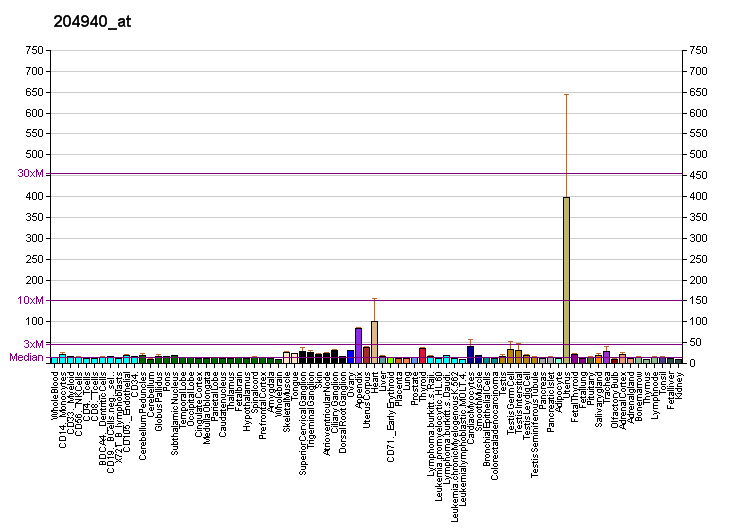

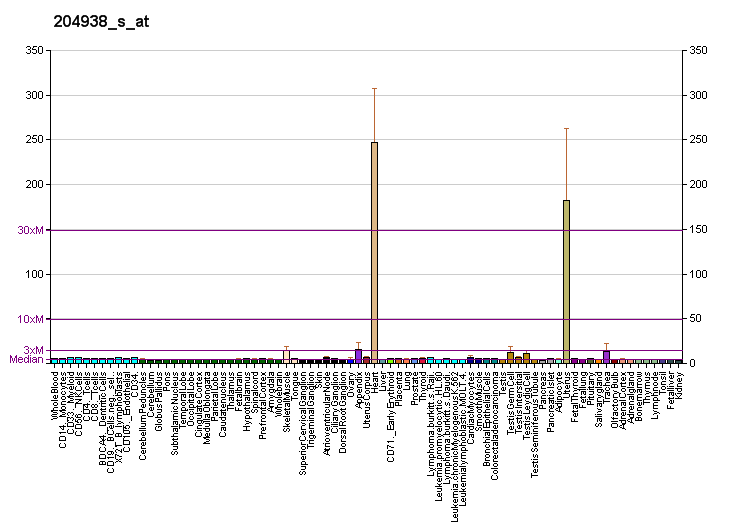

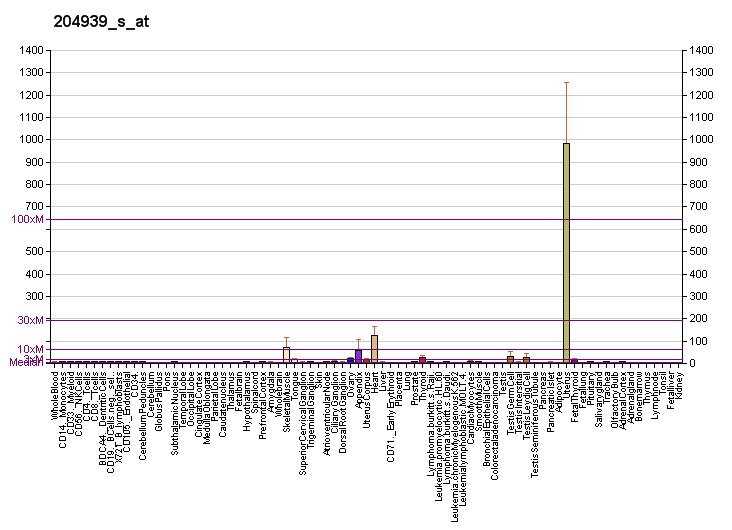
RNA expression pattern
Bgee	Human / Mouse (ortholog); Top expressed in: right ventricle; myocardium; myocardium of left ventricle; cardiac muscle tissue of right atrium; vena cava; Skeletal muscle tissue of rectus abdominis; biceps brachii; Skeletal muscle tissue of biceps brachii; tail of epididymis; triceps brachii muscle / Top expressed in: interventricular septum; right ventricle; cardiac muscles; myocardium of ventricle; atrioventricular valve; left ventricle; aortic valve; endocardial cushion; atrium; extraocular muscle; More reference expression data
BioGPS	More reference expression data
Gene ontology
Molecular function	enzyme inhibitor activity; ATPase binding; calcium channel regulator activity; protein binding; ATPase inhibitor activity; identical protein binding; protein homodimerization activity
Cellular component	integral component of membrane; vesicle; endoplasmic reticulum membrane; membrane; mitochondrial membranes; sarcoplasmic reticulum; endoplasmic reticulum; mitochondrion; sarcoplasmic reticulum membrane; perinuclear region of cytoplasm; calcium ion-transporting ATPase complex; protein-containing complex
Biological process	Notch signaling pathway; regulation of ryanodine-sensitive calcium-release channel activity; negative regulation of calcium ion binding; regulation of cardiac conduction; regulation of calcium ion transport; negative regulation of catalytic activity; regulation of heart contraction; regulation of cytosolic calcium ion concentration; cardiac muscle tissue development; negative regulation of heart contraction; response to testosterone; regulation of the force of heart contraction; regulation of cardiac muscle contraction by regulation of the release of sequestered calcium ion; negative regulation of ATP-dependent activity; regulation of ATPase-coupled calcium transmembrane transporter activity; regulation of calcium ion import; response to zinc ion; cellular calcium ion homeostasis; regulation of relaxation of cardiac muscle; negative regulation of calcium ion transmembrane transporter activity; blood circulation; negative regulation of heart rate; negative regulation of calcium ion import; response to insulin; regulation of cardiac muscle cell contraction; negative regulation of ATPase-coupled calcium transmembrane transporter activity; negative regulation of calcium ion transport; adenylate cyclase-activating adrenergic receptor signaling pathway involved in heart process; regulation of cardiac muscle cell membrane potential; regulation of the force of heart contraction by cardiac conduction; regulation of relaxation of muscle; negative regulation of calcium ion import into sarcoplasmic reticulum; protein homooligomerization; regulation of release of sequestered calcium ion into cytosol by sarcoplasmic reticulum; relaxation of cardiac muscle; calcium ion transport
Sources:Amigo / QuickGO
Orthologs
Databases	NCBI: entry; OMA: entry
Species	Human	Mouse
Entrez	5350	18821
Ensembl	ENSG00000198523	ENSMUSG00000038583
UniProt	P26678	P61014
RefSeq (mRNA)	NM_002667	NM_001141927; NM_023129
RefSeq (protein)	NP_002658	NP_001135399; NP_075618
Location (UCSC)	Chr 6: 118.55 – 118.56 Mb	Chr 10: 53.21 – 53.22 Mb
PubMed search
- Wikidata
View/Edit Human	View/Edit Mouse

Phospholamban, also known as PLN or PLB, is a micropeptide protein that in humans is encoded by the PLN gene. Phospholamban is a 52-amino acid integral membrane protein that regulates the calcium (Ca^{2+}) pump in cardiac muscle cells.

== Function ==
This protein is found as a pentamer and is a major substrate for the cAMP-dependent protein kinase (PKA) in cardiac muscle. In the unphosphorylated state, phospholamban is an inhibitor of cardiac muscle sarcoplasmic reticulum Ca^{2+}-ATPase (SERCA2) which transports calcium from cytosol into the sarcoplasmic reticulum. When phosphorylated (by PKA) - disinhibition of Ca^{2+}-ATPase of SR leads to faster Ca^{2+} uptake into the sarcoplasmic reticulum, thereby contributing to the lusitropic response elicited in heart by beta-agonists. The protein is a key regulator of cardiac diastolic function. Mutations in this gene are a cause of inherited human dilated cardiomyopathy with refractory congestive heart failure.

When phospholamban is phosphorylated by PKA, its ability to inhibit SERCA2 is lost. Thus, activators of PKA, such as the beta-adrenergic agonist epinephrine (released by sympathetic stimulation), may enhance the rate of cardiac myocyte relaxation. In addition, since SERCA2 is more active, the next action potential will cause an increased release of calcium, resulting in increased contraction (positive inotropic effect). When phospholamban is not phosphorylated, such as when PKA is inactive, it can interact with and inhibit SERCA. Thus, the overall effect of unphosphorylated phospholamban is to decrease contractility and the rate of muscle relaxation, thereby decreasing stroke volume and heart rate, respectively.

== Clinical significance ==
Gene knockout of phospholamban results in animals with hyperdynamic hearts, with little apparent negative consequence.

Mutations in this gene are a cause of inherited human dilated cardiomyopathy with refractory congestive heart failure.

== Discovery ==
Phospholamban was discovered by Arnold Martin Katz and coworkers in 1974.

== Interactions ==
PLN has been shown to interact with SLN and SERCA1.
