= Keratosis punctata of the palmar creases =

- Other names: Hyperkeratosis penetrans, Hyperkeratosis punctata, Keratodermia punctata, Keratosis punctata, Keratotic pits of the palmar creases, Lenticular atrophia of the palmar creases, and Punctate keratosis of the palmar creases
- Specialty: Dermatology

Keratosis punctata of the palmar creases is a common skin disorder that occurs most often in black patients, with skin lesions that are 1 to 5mm depressions filled with a comedo-like keratinous plug.

Treatment with etretinate has been described.

== See also ==
- Skin lesion
