= Two-dimensional singular-value decomposition =

Method of decomposing a set of matrices via low-rank approximation

In linear algebra, two-dimensional singular-value decomposition (2DSVD) computes the low-rank approximation of a set of matrices such as 2D images or weather maps in a manner almost identical to SVD (singular-value decomposition) which computes the low-rank approximation of a single matrix (or a set of 1D vectors).

== SVD ==
Let matrix $X = [\mathbf x_1, \ldots, \mathbf x_n]$ contains the set of 1D vectors which have been centered. In PCA/SVD, we construct covariance matrix $F$ and Gram matrix $G$

$F = X X^\mathsf{T}$ , $G = X^\mathsf{T} X,$

and compute their eigenvectors $U = [\mathbf u_1, \ldots, \mathbf u_n]$ and $V = [\mathbf v_1, \ldots, \mathbf v_n]$. Since $VV^\mathsf{T} = I$ and $UU^\mathsf{T} = I$ we have

$$X = UU^\mathsf{T} X VV^\mathsf{T} = U \left(U^\mathsf{T} XV\right) V^\mathsf{T} = U \Sigma V^\mathsf{T}.$$

If we retain only $K$ principal eigenvectors in $U , V$, this gives low-rank approximation of $X$.

== 2DSVD ==
Here we deal with a set of 2D matrices $(X_1,\ldots,X_n)$. Suppose they are centered $\sum_i X_i =0$. We construct row–row and column–column covariance matrices

$F = \sum_i X_i X_i^\mathsf{T}$ and $G = \sum_i X_i^\mathsf{T} X_i$

in exactly the same manner as in SVD, and compute their eigenvectors $U$ and $V$. We approximate $X_i$ as

$$X_i = U U^\mathsf{T} X_i  V V^\mathsf{T} = U \left(U^\mathsf{T} X_i V\right) V^\mathsf{T} = U M_i V^\mathsf{T}$$

in identical fashion as in SVD. This gives a near optimal low-rank approximation of $(X_1,\ldots,X_n)$ with the objective function

$$J=  \sum_{i=1}^n \left| X_i - L M_i R^\mathsf{T}\right| ^2$$

Error bounds similar to Eckard–Young theorem also exist.

2DSVD is mostly used in image compression and representation.
