= Herrlich =

Herrlich is a German surname. Notable people with the surname include:

- Heiko Herrlich (born 1971), German footballer and manager
- Horst Herrlich (1937–2015), German mathematician
- Lotte Herrlich (1883–1956), German photographer
