= Semi-orthogonal matrix =

Linear algebra concept

In linear algebra, a semi-orthogonal matrix is a non-square matrix with real entries where: if the number of columns exceeds the number of rows, then the rows are orthonormal vectors; but if the number of rows exceeds the number of columns, then the columns are orthonormal vectors.

== Properties ==
Let $A$ be an $m \times n$ semi-orthogonal matrix.

- Either $A^{\operatorname{T}} A = I \text{ or } A A^{\operatorname{T}} = I. \,$
- A semi-orthogonal matrix is an isometry. This means that it preserves the norm either in row space, or column space.
- A semi-orthogonal matrix always has full rank.
- A square matrix is semi-orthogonal if and only if it is an orthogonal matrix.
- A real matrix is semi-orthogonal if and only if its non-zero singular values are all equal to 1.
- A semi-orthogonal matrix A is semi-unitary (either A^{†}A = I or AA^{†} = I) and either left-invertible or right-invertible (left-invertible if it has more rows than columns, otherwise right invertible).

== Examples ==
=== Tall matrix (sub-isometry) ===
Consider the $3 \times 2$ matrix whose columns are orthonormal:
$$A = \begin{pmatrix} 1 & 0 \\ 0 & 1 \\ 0 & 0 \end{pmatrix}$$
Here, its columns are orthonormal. Therefore, it is semi-orthogonal, which is confirmed by:
$$A^T A = \begin{pmatrix} 1 & 0 & 0 \\ 0 & 1 & 0 \end{pmatrix} \begin{pmatrix} 1 & 0 \\ 0 & 1 \\ 0 & 0 \end{pmatrix} = \begin{pmatrix} 1 & 0 \\ 0 & 1 \end{pmatrix} = I_2$$

=== Short matrix ===
Consider the $2 \times 3$ matrix whose rows are orthonormal:
$$B = \begin{pmatrix} 1 & 0 & 0 \\ 0 & 1 & 0 \end{pmatrix}$$
Here, its rows are orthonormal. Therefore, it is semi-orthogonal, which is confirmed by:
$$B B^T = \begin{pmatrix} 1 & 0 & 0 \\ 0 & 1 & 0 \end{pmatrix} \begin{pmatrix} 1 & 0 \\ 0 & 1 \\ 0 & 0 \end{pmatrix} = \begin{pmatrix} 1 & 0 \\ 0 & 1 \end{pmatrix} = I_2$$

=== Non-example ===
The following $3 \times 2$ matrix has orthogonal, but not orthonormal, columns and is therefore not semi-orthogonal:
$$C = \begin{pmatrix} 2 & 0 \\ 0 & 1 \\ 0 & 0 \end{pmatrix}$$
The calculation confirms this:
$$C^T C = \begin{pmatrix} 2 & 0 & 0 \\ 0 & 1 & 0 \end{pmatrix} \begin{pmatrix} 2 & 0 \\ 0 & 1 \\ 0 & 0 \end{pmatrix} = \begin{pmatrix} 4 & 0 \\ 0 & 1 \end{pmatrix} \neq I_2$$

== Proofs ==
=== Preservation of Norm ===
If a matrix $A$ is tall or square ($m \ge n$), its semi-orthogonality implies $A^T A = I_n$. For any vector $x \in \mathbb{R}^n$, $A$ preserves its norm: $\|Ax\|_2^2 = (Ax)^T(Ax) = x^T A^T A x = x^T I_n x = \|x\|_2^2$ If a matrix $A$ is short ($m < n$), it preserves the norm of vectors in its row space.

=== Justification for Full Rank ===
If $A^T A = I_n$, then the columns of $A$ are linearly independent, so the rank of $A$ must be $n$. If $A A^T = I_m$, then the rows of $A$ are linearly independent, so the rank of $A$ must be $m$. In both cases, the matrix has full rank.

=== Singular Value Property ===
The statement is that a real matrix $A$ is semi-orthogonal if and only if all of its non-zero singular values are 1.

This follows directly from the SVD, $A = U \Sigma V^T$.

($\implies$) Assume $A$ is semi-orthogonal. Then either $A^T A = I$ or $A A^T = I$. The non-zero singular values of $A$ are the square roots of the non-zero eigenvalues of both $A^T A$ and $A A^T$. Since one of these "Gramian" matrices is an identity matrix, its eigenvalues are all 1. Thus, the non-zero singular values of $A$ must be 1.

($\Leftarrow$) Assume all non-zero singular values of $A$ are 1. This forces the block of $\Sigma$ containing the non-zero values to be an identity matrix. This structure ensures that either $\Sigma^T \Sigma = I_n$ (if $A$ has full column rank) or $\Sigma \Sigma^T = I_m$ (if $A$ has full row rank). Substituting this into the expressions for $A^T A = V(\Sigma^T \Sigma)V^T$ or $A A^T = U(\Sigma \Sigma^T)U^T$ respectively shows that one of them must simplify to an identity matrix, satisfying the definition of a semi-orthogonal matrix.
