= Alexander Dinghas =

Greek mathematician (1908–1974)

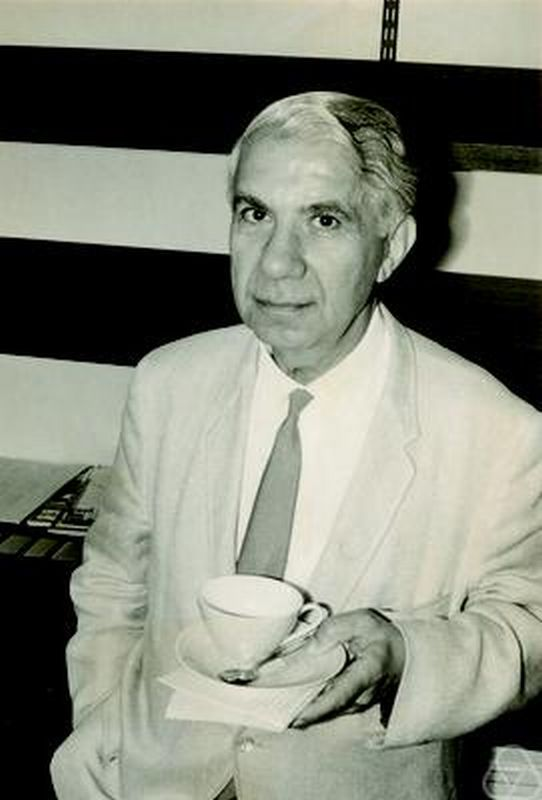
- Born: February 9, 1908; Smyrna
- Died: April 19, 1974 (aged 66); Berlin, Germany
- Education: National Technical University of Athens (1930); University of Berlin (PhD, 1936)
- Scientific career
- Fields: Mathematics
- Institutions: Humboldt University of Berlin; Free University of Berlin
- Thesis: Beiträge zur Theorie der meromorphen Funktionen
- Doctoral advisor: Erhard Schmidt
- Doctoral students: Horst Herrlich

Alexander Dinghas (February 9, 1908 – April 19, 1974) was a Greek mathematician.

== Biography ==
Dinghas was born on February 9, 1908, in Smyrna (now İzmir), Turkey. He did his schooling in Smyrna. He and his family moved to Athens in 1922.

Dinghas completed his secondary school and entered the National Technical University of Athens in 1925. He graduated with a diploma in electrical and mechanical engineering in 1930.

In 1931 Dinghas began his studies at the University of Berlin in Berlin, Germany. He completed his doctorate in mathematics in 1936. He studied under Erhard Schmidt.

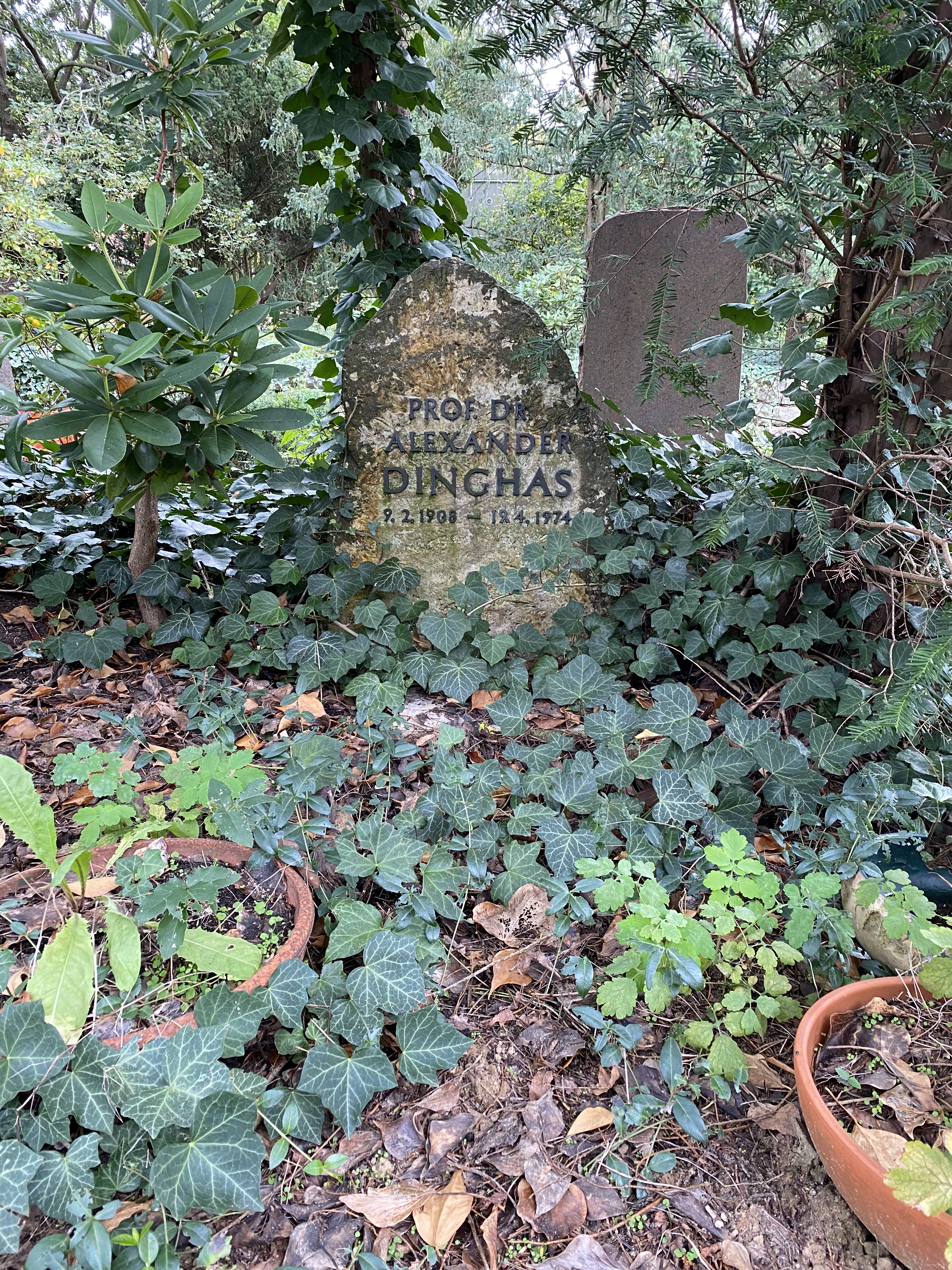
Gravestone of Alexander Dinghas

Dinghas was not a German and his career during the Nazi years was very difficult. However, after the end of World War II, his luck changed. He became professor of mathematics at the Humboldt University of Berlin in 1947. From 1949 until his death he was a professor of mathematics at the Free University of Berlin and director of the Mathematical Institute there.

Dinghas died on April 19, 1974, in Berlin, Germany.

== Work ==
Dinghas is known for his work in different areas of mathematics including differential equations, functions of a complex variable, functions of several complex variables, measure theory and differential geometry. His most important contribution was his work in function theory, in particular Nevanlinna theory and the growth of subharmonic functions.

== Selected works ==
- Vorlesungen über Funktionentheorie, Springer 1961
- Minkowskische Summen und Integrale. Superadditive Mengenfunktionale. Isoperimetrische Ungleichungen (1961)
- Einführung in die Cauchy-Weierstrass'sche Funktionentheorie, BI, 1968
- Zur Differentialgeometrie der klassischen Fundamentalbereiche, Springer 1974
