= Michael Golomb =

American mathematician

Michael Golomb (May 3, 1909 in Munich – April 9, 2008) was an American mathematician and educator who was affiliated with Purdue University for over half a century. He was a student of Erhard Schmidt and Adolf Hammerstein, and received his doctorate from the University of Berlin in 1933. However, as a Jew, he had to leave Germany shortly afterwards to avoid Nazi persecution. After a short period in Zagreb in the former Yugoslavia, Michael Golomb arrived in the U.S. in 1939, when he turned to applied mathematics. He was one of the first mathematicians to apply normed vector spaces in numerical analysis. He taught mathematics at Purdue University from 1942 until his retirement in 1975, at times holding joint appointment with the Schools of Engineering. He continued to teach as Professor Emeritus.

In 1998 in Berlin, Michael Golomb was honored as part of a special exhibition entitled "Terror and Exile: Persecuted and expelled Berlin mathematicians in the time of the Nazi regime." The exhibition was organized by the city of Berlin to coincide with the International Congress of Mathematicians there.

Golomb co-authored a paper with Paul Erdős.
