= Horst Herrlich =

German mathematician

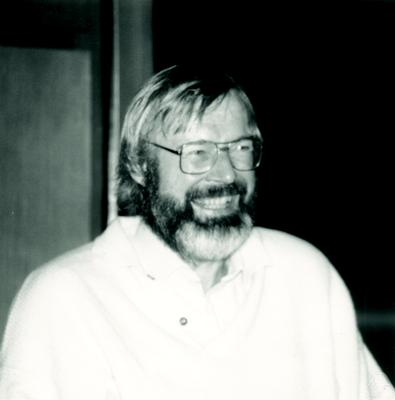
- Horst Herrlich, 1987
- Born: 11 September 1937; Berlin
- Died: 13 March 2015 (aged 77); Bremen
- Known for: categorical topology
- Scientific career
- Fields: Mathematic
- Workplaces: University of Bremen

Horst Herrlich (11 September 1937, in Berlin – 13 March 2015, in Bremen) was a German mathematician, known as a pioneer of categorical topology.

== Education and career ==
Horst Herrlich received his PhD in 1962 with thesis Ordnungsfähigkeit topologischer Räume (Orderability of topological spaces) under Karl Peter Grotemeyer and Alexander Dinghas at the Free University of Berlin, where he also received his habilitation in 1965 with a thesis on E-compact spaces (introduced by Stanisław Mrówka in 1958).

From 1971 to 2002 Herrlich was a professor of mathematics with a focus on general topology and category theory at the University of Bremen. He was part of the editorial staff for the third volume Deskriptive Mengenlehre und Topologie of the collected works of Felix Hausdorff.

He was an Invited Speaker of the International Congress of Mathematicians in 1974 in Vancouver. He is regarded as a founder of categorical topology, which deals with general topology using the methods of category theory.

== Selected publications ==
- Topologische Reflexionen und Coreflexionen (in German), Springer Lecture Notes Math. 78, 1968
- with George E. Strecker: Category Theory: An Introduction. Allyn and Bacon. 1973.
- Einführung in die Topologie: Metrische Räume (in German), Heldermann Verlag, Berlin, 1986
- Topologie I: Topologische Räume (in German), Heldermann Verlag, Berlin, 1986
- Topologie II: Uniforme Räume (in German), Heldermann Verlag, Berlin, 1988
- with Jiří Adámek and George E. Strecker: Abstract and Concrete Categories. Wiley-Interscience Publ., New York. 1990.
- Axiom of Choice. Springer Lecture Notes Math. vol. 1876. 2006. ISBN 978-3-540-34268-7.
