= Gale J. Young =

American engineer and mathematical physicist

- Born: March 5, 1912; Baroda, Michigan
- Died: May 21, 1990 (aged 78)
- Education: Milwaukee School of Engineering (B.S.E.); University of Chicago (M.S.)
- Scientific career
- Fields: Physics; nuclear engineering; applied mathematics
- Workplaces: Metallurgical Laboratory; Oak Ridge National Laboratory

Gale J. Young (1912–1990) was an American engineer, mathematical physicist, biophysicist, and applied mathematician. He is known as a pioneer of nuclear engineering and as one of the namesakes of the Eckart–Young theorem in linear algebra.

== Education and career ==
He graduated in 1933 with a bachelor's degree in electrical engineering from the Milwaukee School of Engineering. At the University of Chicago he became in 1933 a graduate student in physics and received in 1936 a master's degree in mathematical physics. He continued to be affiliated with the University of Chicago until 1940 when he became the head of the physics and mathematics departments at Olivet College in Michigan. In early 1942 he returned to Chicago to work in Eugene Wigner's Theoretical Group developing nuclear reactors. Wigner claimed that Gale Young was his "main helper in 1942 in designing a nuclear pile cooled by water." From 1942 to 1946 Young was a research associate on the Manhattan Project at the University of Chicago's Metallurgical Laboratory (Met Lab). He later shared the patent for the design of water-cooled nuclear reactors. In 1946 he joined Wigner at the Clinton Laboratories, which was renamed Clinton National Laboratory in late 1947 and again renamed in January 1948 as Oak Ridge National Laboratory (ORNL). In 1948 Young and John R. Menke (1919–2009) founded Nuclear Development Associates (NDA), Inc., the first privately owned nuclear firm. Menke was the president and Young was the research director. When NDA was taken over by the United Nuclear Company, Young remained with the company until 1962. In 1962 he returned to ORNL as an assistant laboratory director, working on non-military applications of nuclear energy, especially desalination of seawater.

== Selected publications ==
- Eckart, Carl; Young, Gale (1936). "The approximation of one matrix by another of lower rank". Psychometrika. 1 (3): 211–218. doi:10.1007/BF02288367. S2CID 10163399. (statement and proof of the Eckart-Young theorem)
- Householder, A. S.; Young, Gale (1938). "Matrix Approximation and Latent Roots". The American Mathematical Monthly. 45 (3): 165–171. doi:10.1080/00029890.1938.11990787.
- Young, Gale; Householder, A. S. (1938). "Discussion of a set of points in terms of their mutual distances". Psychometrika. 3: 19–22. doi:10.1007/BF02287916. S2CID 122400126.
- Eckart, Carl; Young, Gale (1939). "A principal axis transformation for non-hermitian matrices" (PDF). Bulletin of the American Mathematical Society. 45 (2): 118–122. doi:10.1090/S0002-9904-1939-06910-3.
- Offner, Franklin; Weinberg, Alvin; Young, Gale (1940). "Nerve conduction theory: Some mathematical consequences of Bernstein's model". Bulletin of Mathematical Biophysics. 2 (2): 89–103. doi:10.1007/BF02478173. (See Julius Bernstein.)
- Young, Gale (1941). "Maximum likelihood estimation and factor analysis". Psychometrika. 6: 49–53. doi:10.1007/bF02288574. S2CID 120941345.
