= Unitary equivalence =

Unitary equivalence may refer to:

- Unitary equivalence of bounded operators in Hilbert space; see self-adjoint operator
- Unitary equivalence of a unitary representation
