= Erhard Schmidt =

Baltic German mathematician

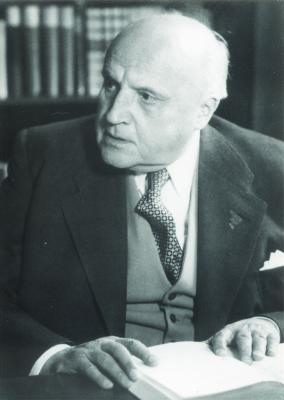
- Erhard Schmidt (courtesy MFO)
- Born: 13 January 1876; Tartu, Governorate of Livonia (now Estonia)
- Died: 6 December 1959 (aged 83); Berlin
- Education: University of Göttingen
- Known for: Schmidt decomposition Gram–Schmidt process Hilbert–Schmidt operator Hilbert–Schmidt integral operator Singular value
- Scientific career
- Fields: Mathematics
- Thesis: Entwickelung willkürlicher Functionen nach Systemen vorgeschriebener (1905)
- Doctoral advisor: David Hilbert
- Doctoral students: Salomon Bochner; Alfred Brauer; Richard Brauer; Lothar Collatz; Alexander Dinghas; Michael Golomb; Guido Hoheisel; Eberhard Hopf; Heinz Hopf; Martin Kneser; Wilhelm Specht

Erhard Schmidt (13 January 1876 – 6 December 1959) was a Baltic German mathematician whose work significantly influenced the direction of mathematics in the twentieth century. Schmidt was born in Tartu (German: Dorpat), in the Governorate of Livonia (now Estonia).

== Mathematics ==
His advisor was David Hilbert and he was awarded his doctorate from University of Göttingen in 1905. His doctoral dissertation was entitled Entwickelung willkürlicher Funktionen nach Systemen vorgeschriebener and was a work on integral equations. Together with David Hilbert he made important contributions to functional analysis. Ernst Zermelo credited conversations with Schmidt for the idea and method for his classic 1904 proof of the Well-ordering theorem from an "Axiom of choice", which has become an integral part of modern set theory.

After the war, in 1948, Schmidt founded and became the first editor-in-chief of the journal Mathematische Nachrichten.

== National Socialism ==
During World War II Schmidt held positions of authority at the University of Berlin and had to carry out various Nazi resolutions against the Jews—a job that he apparently did not do well, since he was criticized at one point for not understanding the "Jewish question". At the celebration of Schmidt's 75th birthday in 1951 a prominent Jewish mathematician, Hans Freudenthal, who had survived the Nazi years, spoke of the difficulties that Schmidt faced during that period without criticism. Schmidt was, however, a conservative and a nationalist, and, in 1938, defended Hitler after Kristallnacht, telling Jewish mathematician Issai Schur: "Suppose we had to fight a war to rearm Germany, unite with Austria, liberate the Saar and the German part of Czechoslovakia. Such a war would have cost us half a million young men. But everybody would have admired our victorious leader. Now, Hitler has sacrificed half a million Jews and has achieved great things for Germany. I hope some day you will be recompensed but I am still grateful to Hitler".

== See also ==
- Chebyshev function
- Isoperimetric inequality
- Low-rank approximation
- List of Baltic German scientists
