= Anchorage in reinforced concrete =

Reinforced concrete is concrete in which reinforcement bars ("rebars"), reinforcement grids, plates or fibers are embedded to create bond and thus to strengthen the concrete in tension. The composite material was invented by French gardener Joseph Monier in 1849 and patented in 1867.

== Description ==
Conventionally the term concrete refers only to concrete that is reinforced with iron or steel. However, other materials are often used to reinforce concrete e.g. organic and inorganic fibres, composites in different forms. While compared to its compressive strength, concrete is weak in tension. Thus adding reinforcement increases the strength in tension. The other purpose of providing reinforcement in concrete is to hold the tension cracked sections together.

== Mechanism of composite action of reinforcement and concrete ==
The reinforcement in a RC structure, such as a steel bar, has to undergo the same strain or deformation as the surrounding concrete in order to prevent discontinuity, slip or separation of the two materials under load. Maintaining composite action requires transfer of load between the concrete and steel. The direct stress is transferred from the concrete to the bar interface so as to change the tensile stress in the reinforcing bar along its length. This load transfer is achieved by means of bond (anchorage) and is idealized as a continuous stress field that develops in the vicinity of the steel-concrete interface.

== Anchorage (bond) in concrete: Codes of specifications ==
Because the actual bond stress varies along the length of a bar anchored in a zone of tension, most international codes of specifications use the concept of development length rather than bond stress. The same concept applies to lap splice length mentioned in the codes where splices (overlapping) provided between two adjacent bars in order to maintain the required continuity of stress in the splice zone.

== See also ==
- Reinforced solid
