= Block reflector =

"A block reflector is an orthogonal, symmetric matrix that reverses a subspace whose dimension may be greater than one."

It is built out of many elementary reflectors.

It is also referred to as a triangular factor, and is a triangular matrix and they are used in the Householder transformation.

A reflector $Q$ belonging to $\mathcal M_n(\R)$ can be written in the form : $Q = I -auu^T$ where $I$ is the identity matrix for $\mathcal M_n(\R)$, $a$ is a scalar and $u$ belongs to $\R^n$ .

== LAPACK routines ==
Here are some of the LAPACK routines that apply to block reflectors

- "*larft" forms the triangular vector T of a block reflector H=I-VTVH.
- "*larzb" applies a block reflector or its transpose/conjugate transpose as returned by "*tzrzf" to a general matrix.
- "*larzt" forms the triangular vector T of a block reflector H=I-VTVH as returned by "*tzrzf".
- "*larfb" applies a block reflector or its transpose/conjugate transpose to a general rectangular matrix.

== See also ==
- Reflection (mathematics)
- Householder transformation
- Unitary matrix
- Triangular matrix
