= Reinforced solid =

Type of material in solid mechanics

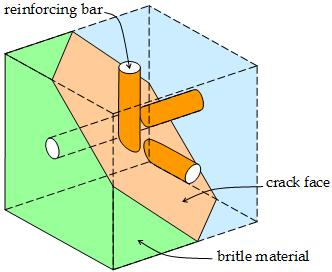
Figure 1: Small cube of a material with reinforcing bars. The cube is cracked and the material above the crack is removed to show the reinforcement that crosses the crack.

In solid mechanics, a reinforced solid is a brittle material that is reinforced by ductile bars or fibres. A common application is reinforced concrete. When the concrete cracks the tensile force in a crack is not carried any more by the concrete but by the steel reinforcing bars only. The reinforced concrete will continue to carry the load provided that sufficient reinforcement is present. A typical design problem is to find the smallest amount of reinforcement that can carry the stresses on a small cube (Fig. 1). This can be formulated as an optimization problem.

== Optimization problem ==
The reinforcement is directed in the x, y and z direction. The reinforcement ratio is defined in a cross-section of a reinforcing bar as the reinforcement area $A_{r}$ over the total area $A$, which is the brittle material area plus the reinforcement area.

$\rho_{x}$ = $A_{rx}$ / $A_{x}$

$\rho_{y}$ = $A_{ry}$ / $A_{y}$

$\rho_{z}$ = $A_{rz}$ / $A_{z}$

In case of reinforced concrete the reinforcement ratios are usually between 0.1% and 2%. The yield stress of the reinforcement is denoted by $f_{y}$. The stress tensor of the brittle material is

$$\left[{\begin{matrix}
\sigma _{xx} - \rho_{x} f_{y} & \sigma _{xy} & \sigma _{xz} \\
\sigma _{xy} & \sigma _{yy} - \rho_{y} f_{y} & \sigma _{yz} \\
\sigma _{xz} & \sigma _{yz} & \sigma _{zz} - \rho_{z} f_{y} \\
\end{matrix}}\right]$$.

This can be interpreted as the stress tensor of the composite material minus the stresses carried by the reinforcement at yielding. This formulation is accurate for reinforcement ratio's smaller than 5%. It is assumed that the brittle material has no tensile strength. (In case of reinforced concrete this assumption is necessary because the concrete has small shrinkage cracks.) Therefore, the principal stresses of the brittle material need to be compression. The principal stresses of a stress tensor are its eigenvalues.

The optimization problem is formulated as follows. Minimize $\rho_{x}$ + $\rho_{y}$ + $\rho_{z}$ subject to all eigenvalues of the brittle material stress tensor are less than or equal to zero (negative-semidefinite). Additional constraints are $\rho_{x}$ ≥ 0, $\rho_{y}$ ≥ 0, $\rho_{z}$ ≥ 0.

== Solution ==
The solution to this problem can be presented in a form most suitable for hand calculations. It can be presented in graphical form. It can also be presented in a form most suitable for computer implementation. In this article the latter method is shown.

There are 12 possible reinforcement solutions to this problem, which are shown in the table below. Every row contains a possible solution. The first column contains the number of a solution. The second column gives conditions for which a solution is valid. Columns 3, 4 and 5 give the formulas for calculating the reinforcement ratios.

	Condition	$\rho_{x}$ $f_{y}$	$\rho_{y}$ $f_{y}$	$\rho_{z}$ $f_{y}$
1	$I_{1}$ ≤ 0, $I_{2}$ ≥ 0, $I_{3}$ ≤ 0	0	0	0
2	$\sigma_{yy}\sigma_{zz} - \sigma^2_{yz}$ > 0 $I_{1}(\sigma_{yy}\sigma_{zz} - \sigma^2_{yz}) - I_{3}$ ≤ 0 $I_{2}(\sigma_{yy}\sigma_{zz} - \sigma^2_{yz}) - I_{3}(\sigma_{yy}+\sigma_{zz})$ ≥ 0	$\frac{I_{3}}{\sigma_{yy} \sigma_{zz} - \sigma^2_{yz}}$	0	0
3	$\sigma_{xx}\sigma_{zz} - \sigma^2_{xz}$ > 0 $I_{1}(\sigma_{xx}\sigma_{zz} - \sigma^2_{xz}) - I_{3}$ ≤ 0 $I_{2}(\sigma_{xx}\sigma_{zz} - \sigma^2_{xz}) - I_{3}(\sigma_{xx}+\sigma_{zz})$ ≥ 0	0	$\frac{I_{3}}{\sigma_{xx} \sigma_{zz} - \sigma^2_{xz}}$	0
4	$\sigma_{xx}\sigma_{yy} - \sigma^2_{xy}$ > 0 $I_{1}(\sigma_{xx}\sigma_{yy} - \sigma^2_{xy}) - I_{3}$ ≤ 0 $I_{2}(\sigma_{xx}\sigma_{yy} - \sigma^2_{xy}) - I_{3}(\sigma_{xx}+\sigma_{yy})$ ≥ 0	0	0	$\frac{I_{3}}{\sigma_{xx} \sigma_{yy} - \sigma^2_{xy}}$
5	$\sigma_{xx}<0$	0	$\sigma_{yy}- \frac{\sigma^2_{xy}}{\sigma_{xx}} +|\sigma_{yz}-\frac{\sigma_{xz}\sigma_{xy}}{\sigma_{xx}}|$	$\sigma_{zz}-\frac{\sigma^2_{xz}}{\sigma_{xx}}+|\sigma_{yz}-\frac{\sigma_{xz}\sigma_{xy}}{\sigma_{xx}}|$
6	$\sigma_{yy}<0$	$\sigma_{xx}-\frac{\sigma^2_{xy}}{\sigma_{yy}} +|\sigma_{xz}-\frac{\sigma_{yz}\sigma_{xy}}{\sigma_{yy}}|$	0	$\sigma_{zz}-\frac{\sigma^2_{yz}}{\sigma_{yy}} +|\sigma_{xz}-\frac{\sigma_{yz}\sigma_{xy}}{\sigma_{yy}}|$
7	$\sigma_{zz}<0$	$\sigma_{xx}-\frac{\sigma^2_{xz}}{\sigma_{zz}} +|\sigma_{xy}-\frac{\sigma_{yz}\sigma_{xz}}{\sigma_{zz}}|$	$\sigma_{yy} -\frac{\sigma^2_{yz}}{\sigma_{zz}} +|\sigma_{xy} -\frac{\sigma_{xz}\sigma_{yz}}{\sigma_{zz}}|$	0
8	$\sigma_{yz} + \sigma_{xz} + \sigma_{xy}$ ≥ 0 $\sigma_{xz}\sigma_{xy} + \sigma_{yz}\sigma_{xy} + \sigma_{yz}\sigma_{xz}$ ≥ 0	$\sigma_{xx} + \sigma_{xz} + \sigma_{xy}$	$\sigma_{yy} + \sigma_{yz} + \sigma_{xy}$	$\sigma_{zz} + \sigma_{yz} + \sigma_{xz}$
9	$- \sigma_{yz} - \sigma_{xz} + \sigma_{xy}$ ≥ 0 $- \sigma_{xz}\sigma_{xy} - \sigma_{yz}\sigma_{xy} + \sigma_{yz}\sigma_{xz}$ ≥ 0	$\sigma_{xx} - \sigma_{xz} + \sigma_{xy}$	$\sigma_{yy} - \sigma_{yz} + \sigma_{xy}$	$\sigma_{zz} - \sigma_{yz} - \sigma_{xz}$
10	$\sigma_{yz} - \sigma_{xz} - \sigma_{xy}$ ≥ 0 $\sigma_{xz}\sigma_{xy} - \sigma_{yz}\sigma_{xy} - \sigma_{yz}\sigma_{xz}$ ≥ 0	$\sigma_{xx} - \sigma_{xz} - \sigma_{xy}$	$\sigma_{yy} + \sigma_{yz} - \sigma_{xy}$	$\sigma_{zz} + \sigma_{yz} - \sigma_{xz}$
11	$- \sigma_{yz} + \sigma_{xz} - \sigma_{xy}$ ≥ 0 $- \sigma_{xz}\sigma_{xy} + \sigma_{yz}\sigma_{xy} - \sigma_{yz}\sigma_{xz}$ ≥ 0	$\sigma_{xx} + \sigma_{xz} - \sigma_{xy}$	$\sigma_{yy} - \sigma_{yz} - \sigma_{xy}$	$\sigma_{zz} - \sigma_{yz} + \sigma_{xz}$
12	$\sigma_{xy}\sigma_{xz}\sigma_{yz}<0$	$\sigma_{xx} - \frac{\sigma_{xz}\sigma_{xy}}{\sigma_{yz}}$	$\sigma_{yy} - \frac{\sigma_{yz}\sigma_{xy}}{\sigma_{xz}}$	$\sigma_{zz} - \frac{\sigma_{yz}\sigma_{xz}}{\sigma_{xy}}$

$I_{1}$, $I_{2}$ and $I_{3}$ are the stress invariants of the composite material stress tensor.

The algorithm for obtaining the right solution is simple. Compute the reinforcement ratios of each possible solution that fulfills the conditions. Further ignore solutions with a reinforcement ratio less than zero. Compute the values of $\rho_{x}$ + $\rho_{y}$ + $\rho_{z}$ and select the solution for which this value is smallest. The principal stresses in the brittle material can be computed as the eigenvalues of the brittle material stress tensor, for example by Jacobi's method.

The formulas can be simply checked by substituting the reinforcement ratios in the brittle material stress tensor and calculating the invariants. The first invariant needs to be less than or equal to zero. The second invariant needs to be greater than or equal to zero. These provide the conditions in column 2. For solution 2 to 12, the third invariant needs to be zero.

== Examples ==
The table below shows computed reinforcement ratios for 10 stress tensors. The applied reinforcement yield stress is $f_{y}$ = 500 N/mm². The mass density of the reinforcing bars is 7800 kg/m^{3}. In the table $\sigma_{m}$ is the computed brittle material stress. $m_{r}$ is the optimised amount of reinforcement.

	$\sigma_{xx}$	$\sigma_{yy}$	$\sigma_{zz}$	$\sigma_{yz}$	$\sigma_{xz}$	$\sigma_{xy}$	$\rho_{x}$	$\rho_{y}$	$\rho_{z}$	$\sigma_{m}$	$m_{r}$
1	1 N/mm²	2 N/mm²	3 N/mm²	-4 N/mm²	3 N/mm²	-1 N/mm²	1.00%	1.40%	2.00%	-10.65 N/mm²	343 kg/m^{3}
2	-5	2	3	4	3	1	0.00	1.36	1.88	-10.31	253
3	-5	-6	3	4	3	1	0.00	0.00	1.69	-10.15	132
4	-5	-6	-6	4	3	1	0.00	0.00	0.00	-10.44	0
5	1	2	3	-4	-3	-1	0.60	1.00	2.00	-10.58	281
6	1	-2	3	-4	3	2	0.50	0.13	1.80	-10.17	190
7	1	2	3	4	2	-1	0.40	1.00	1.80	-9.36	250
8	2	-2	5	2	-4	6	2.40	0.40	1.40	-15.21	328
9	-3	-7	0	2	-4	6	0.89	0.00	0.57	-14.76	114
10	3	0	10	0	5	0	1.60	0.00	3.00	-10.00	359

Elaborate contour plots for beams, a corbel, a pile cap and a trunnion girder can be found in the dissertation of Reinaldo Chen.

== Safe approximation ==
The solution to the optimization problem can be approximated conservatively.

$\rho_{x} f_{y}$ = $\sigma_{xx} + |\sigma_{xy}| + |\sigma_{xz}|$

$\rho_{y} f_{y}$ = $\sigma_{yy} + |\sigma_{xy}| + |\sigma_{yz}|$

$\rho_{z} f_{y}$ = $\sigma_{zz} + |\sigma_{xz}| + |\sigma_{yz}|$

This can be proofed as follows. For this upper bound, the characteristic polynomial of the brittle material stress tensor is

$\lambda^3 + 2(|\sigma_{yz}|+|\sigma_{xz}|+|\sigma_{xy}|)\lambda^2 + 3(|\sigma_{xz}\sigma_{xy}|+|\sigma_{yz}\sigma_{xy}|+|\sigma_{yz}\sigma_{xz}|)\lambda + 2|\sigma_{yz}\sigma_{xz}\sigma_{xy}| - 2\sigma_{yz}\sigma_{xz}\sigma_{xy}$,

which does not have positive roots, or eigenvalues.

The approximation is easy to remember and can be used to check or replace computation results.

== Extension ==
The above solution can be very useful to design reinforcement; however, it has some practical limitations. The following aspects can be included too, if the problem is solved using convex optimization:

- Multiple stress tensors in one point due to multiple loads on the structure instead of only one stress tensor
- A constraint imposed to crack widths at the surface of the structure
- Shear stress in the crack (aggregate interlock)
- Reinforcement in other directions than x, y and z
- Reinforcing bars that already have been placed in the reinforcement design process
- The whole structure instead of one small material cube in turn
- Large reinforcement ratio's
- Compression reinforcement

== Bars in any direction ==
Reinforcing bars can have other directions than the x, y and z direction. In case of one bar, the stress tensor of the brittle material is computed by

$$\left[{\begin{matrix}
\sigma _{xx} & \sigma _{xy} & \sigma _{xz} \\
\sigma _{xy} & \sigma _{yy} & \sigma _{yz} \\
\sigma _{xz} & \sigma _{yz} & \sigma _{zz} \\
\end{matrix}}\right]
- \rho f _{y}
\left[{\begin{matrix}
\cos^2(\alpha) & \cos(\alpha)\cos(\beta) & \cos(\alpha)\cos(\gamma) \\
\cos(\beta)\cos(\alpha) & \cos^2(\beta)  & \cos(\beta)\cos(\gamma) \\
\cos(\gamma)\cos(\alpha) & \cos(\gamma)\cos(\beta) & \cos^2(\gamma) \\
\end{matrix}}\right]$$

where $\alpha, \beta, \gamma$ are the angles of the bar with the x, y and z axis. Bars in other directions can be added in the same way. We can minimize the sum of the $\rho$'s, for which the eigenvalues are less than or equal to zero.

== Utilization ==
Often, builders of reinforced concrete structures know, from experience, where to put reinforcing bars. Computer tools can support this by checking whether proposed reinforcement is sufficient. To this end the tension criterion,

The eigenvalues of
$$\left[{\begin{matrix}
\sigma _{xx} - \rho_{x} f_{y} & \sigma _{xy} & \sigma _{xz} \\
\sigma _{xy} & \sigma _{yy} - \rho_{y} f_{y} & \sigma _{yz} \\
\sigma _{xz} & \sigma _{yz} & \sigma _{zz} - \rho_{z} f_{y} \\
\end{matrix}}\right]$$
shall be less than or equal to zero.

is rewritten into,

The eigenvalues of
$$\left[{\begin{matrix}
\frac{\sigma _{xx}}{\rho _{x} f _{y}}           & \frac{\sigma _{xy}}{\sqrt{\rho _{x} \rho _{y}} f _{y}} & \frac{\sigma _{xz}}{\sqrt{\rho _{x} \rho _{z}} f _{y}} \\
\frac{\sigma _{xy}}{\sqrt{\rho _{x} \rho _{y}} f _{y}} & \frac{\sigma _{yy}}{\rho _{y} f _{y}}           & \frac{\sigma _{yz}}{\sqrt{\rho _{y} \rho _{z}} f _{y}} \\
\frac{\sigma _{xz}}{\sqrt{\rho _{x} \rho _{z}} f _{y}} & \frac{\sigma _{yz}}{\sqrt{\rho _{y} \rho _{z}} f _{y}} & \frac{\sigma _{zz}}{\rho _{z} f _{y}} \\
\end{matrix}}\right]$$
shall be less than or equal to one.

The latter matrix is the utilization tensor. The largest eigenvalue of this tensor is the utilization (unity check), which can be displayed in a contour plot of a structure for all load combinations related to the ultimate limit state.

For example, the stress at some location in a structure is $\sigma_{xx}$ = 4 N/mm², $\sigma_{yy}$ = -10 N/mm², $\sigma_{zz}$ = 3 N/mm², $\sigma_{yz}$ = 3 N/mm², $\sigma_{xz}$ = -7 N/mm², $\sigma_{xy}$ = 1 N/mm². The reinforcement yield stress is $f_{y}$ = 500 N/mm². The proposed reinforcement is $\rho_{x}$ = 1.4%, $\rho_{y}$ = 0.1%, $\rho_{z}$ = 1.9%. The eigenvalues of the utilization tensor are -20.11, -0.33 and 1.32. The utilization is 1.32. This shows that the bars are overloaded and 32% more reinforcement is required.

The verification can also be written like this.

The largest eigenvalue of
$$\left[{\begin{matrix}
\frac{\sigma _{xx}}{\rho _{x}}           & \frac{\sigma _{xy}}{\sqrt{\rho _{x} \rho _{y}}} & \frac{\sigma _{xz}}{\sqrt{\rho _{x} \rho _{z}}} \\
\frac{\sigma _{xy}}{\sqrt{\rho _{x} \rho _{y}}} & \frac{\sigma _{yy}}{\rho _{y}}           & \frac{\sigma _{yz}}{\sqrt{\rho _{y} \rho _{z}}} \\
\frac{\sigma _{xz}}{\sqrt{\rho _{x} \rho _{z}}} & \frac{\sigma _{yz}}{\sqrt{\rho _{y} \rho _{z}}} & \frac{\sigma _{zz}}{\rho _{z}} \\
\end{matrix}}\right]$$
shall be less than $f _{y}$.

In this, $f _{y}$ is the yield stress of the reinforcing bars. The computed rebar stress is such that the concrete does not carry tension in any direction.

This can be generalized as: the largest eigenvalue of

$$\left[{\sum _{i} \rho _{i}
\left[{\begin{matrix}
\cos^2(\alpha _{i}) & \cos(\alpha _{i})\cos(\beta _{i}) & \cos(\alpha _{i})\cos(\gamma _{i}) \\
\cos(\beta _{i})\cos(\alpha _{i}) & \cos^2(\beta _{i})  & \cos(\beta _{i})\cos(\gamma _{i}) \\
\cos(\gamma _{i})\cos(\alpha _{i}) & \cos(\gamma _{i})\cos(\beta _{i}) & \cos^2(\gamma _{i}) \\
\end{matrix}}\right]
}\right] ^{-1}
\left[{\begin{matrix}
\sigma _{xx} & \sigma _{xy} & \sigma _{xz} \\
\sigma _{xy} & \sigma _{yy} & \sigma _{yz} \\
\sigma _{xz} & \sigma _{yz} & \sigma _{zz} \\
\end{matrix}}\right]$$

shall be less than $f _{y}$.

== Compression failure ==
Combined compression and shear failure of the brittle material can be checked with the Mohr-Coulomb criterion applied to the eigenvalues of the stress tensor of the brittle material.

$\frac{\sigma_{1}}{f_{t}} + \frac{\sigma_{3}}{f_{c}}$ ≤ 1,

where $\sigma_{1}$ is the largest principal stress, $\sigma_{3}$ is the smallest principal stress, $f_{c}$ is the uniaxial compressive strength (negative value) and $f_{t}$ is the tensile strength. We can use the tensile strength here because the lumps of concrete that form compression diagonals are not cracked.

== Crack width ==
Cracks in the solid material can be computed by a few iterations of a non-linear finite element analysis. Finite element crack widths are displayed in integration points. For reinforced concrete, the engineer needs to calculate the crack spacing using a code of practice and add the integration point crack widths over the crack spacing. The code also specifies what crack width is acceptable. Clearly, crack widths need checking only at the surface of a structure for stress states due to load combinations related to the serviceability limit state.

== See also ==
- Reinforced concrete
- Solid mechanics
- Structural engineering
