= Steel plate construction =

Method of construction

Steel plate construction is a method of rapidly constructing heavy reinforced concrete items.

== Development ==
The method was developed in Korea in 2004 at a steel fabricator.

== Construction method ==
Each assembly has two parallel steel plates joined by welded stringers or tie bars. The assemblies are then moved to the job site and placed with a crane. Finally, the space between the plate walls is filled with concrete. The method provides excellent strength because the steel is on the outside, where tensile forces are often greatest.

Construction with this method is accomplished roughly twice as fast with as other methods of reinforced concrete construction, because by constructing at specialized off-site fabrication facilities it avoids tying rebar and constructing forms on-site. Because of the rapid construction time, the cost of large-scale projects can be significantly decreased when this method is used.

== Application ==
The method is of special interest for rapidly constructing nuclear power plants, which use large reinforced concrete structures, and typically have long construction times, with high costs.
