= RRQR factorization =

Concept in linear algebra

An RRQR factorization or rank-revealing QR factorization is a matrix decomposition algorithm based on the QR factorization which can be used to determine the rank of a matrix. The singular value decomposition can be used to generate an RRQR, but it is not an efficient method to do so. An RRQR implementation is available in MATLAB.
