= Spicer (surname) =

- Pronunciation: /ˈspaɪsər/
- Language: Middle English

Origin
- Meaning: Seller of spices; a grocer or druggist

Other names
- Variant form: Spitzer

The Middle English surname Spicer /ˈspaɪsər/ is derived from the Old French word especier, which in turn was derived from the Latin speciarius. Translated, it refers to a seller of spices, a grocer or a druggist. It is also a variation of the Jewish name Spitzer.

People with the surname Spicer include:

- Sir Albert Spicer, 1st Baronet (1847–1934), English businessman and Liberal politician
- Andi Spicer (1959–2020), British composer
- André Spicer, New Zealand professor of organisational behaviour
- Bob Spicer (1925–2016), American baseball player
- Bryan Spicer, television director, 24
- Clarence W. Spicer, inventor of the Universal joint (Spicer joint)
- Dave Spicer (born 1985), Canadian rugby player
- David Spicer (disambiguation), several people
- Dorothy Gladys Spicer (1893–1975), American writer
- Dorothy Spicer (1908–1946), English aviator
- Eddie Spicer (1922–2004), English football player
- Eleanor Washington Spicer (1903–1974), American clubwoman and philanthropist
- Ella Spicer (1876–1958), New Zealand painter
- Frederick Spicer (1820–1905), medical doctor and, briefly, politician in South Australia
- Geoffrey Spicer-Simson (1876–1947), a Royal Navy officer
- Grace Spicer (born 1992), English kickboxer
- Harriet Spicer (born 1950), lay member of the Judicial Appointments Commission in England and Wales
- Sir Howard Handley Spicer (1872–1926), papermaker, wholesale stationer and magazine editor, founder of the Empire League
- Ishmail Spicer (1760–1832), American composer
- Jack Spicer (disambiguation), several people
- James Spicer (1925–2015), British Conservative
- Jeff Spicer, American politician
- Jimmy Spicer, rap artist
- John Spicer (disambiguation), several people
- Keith Spicer (1934–2023), Canadian Commissioner of Official Languages
- Kimberly Spicer (born 1980), American actress
- Lancelot Dykes Spicer (1893–1979), British Liberal Party politician
- Lorne Spicer (born 1965), British television presenter
- Michael Spicer (1943–2019), British politician
- Nellie Spicer (born 1987), American volleyball player
- Paul Spicer (born 1975), American football player
- Peggy Spicer (1908–1984), New Zealand artist
- Phoenix Spicer (2002–2026), Australian rules footballer
- Raymond A. Spicer, director of the White House Military Office
- Sean Spicer (born 1971), political strategist and White House Press Secretary and Communications Director
- Simeon Spicer (died 1908), American politician
- Tim Spicer (born 1952), Lieutenant-Colonel in the Scots Guards
- Tracey Spicer, Australian journalist
- Wells Spicer, American lawyer
- William Ambrose Spicer (1865–1952), Seventh-day Adventist minister
- William L. Spicer (1918–1991), American politician
- William Spicer (Medal of Honor), American Medal of Honor recipient
- William Webb Spicer (1820–1879), English botanist and Anglican rector
