= Spitzer =

Spitzer is a surname. Notable people with the surname include:

- Andre Spitzer (1945–1972), Israeli fencing coach and victim of the Munich massacre
- Bernard Spitzer (1924–2014), American real estate developer and philanthropist, father of Eliot Spitzer
- Doreen Canaday Spitzer (1914–2010), American archaeologist
- Eliot Spitzer (born 1959), 54th Governor of New York (2007–2008)
- Frank Spitzer (1926–1992), Austrian-born American mathematician, author of Spitzer's formula
- Frédéric Spitzer, 19th century art dealer, after whom the Spitzer Cross is named
- Leo Spitzer (1887–1960), Austrian linguist
- Lyman Spitzer (1914–1997), American theoretical physicist and mountaineer
- Moritz Spitzer, scholar who gave his name to the Spitzer Manuscript
- Robert Spitzer (priest) (born 1952), American Jesuit priest and president of Gonzaga University (1998–2009)
- Robert R. Spitzer (1922–2019), American agricultural researcher and president of the Milwaukee School of Engineering (1977–1991)
- Robert Spitzer (political scientist) (born 1953), American political scientist
- Robert Spitzer (psychiatrist) (1932–2015), American psychiatrist
- Šime Spitzer (1892–1941), Croatian Zionist
- Simon Spitzer (1826–1887), Austrian mathematician
- Thomas Harald Spitzer (born 1953), Austrian lyricist, composer, singer, guitarist and graphic designer
- Thomas Eduard Spitzer (born 1988), German author, comedian and online producer
- Toba Spitzer, American rabbi and president of the Reconstructionist Rabbinical Association (2007–2009)
- Todd Spitzer (born 1960), district attorney of Orange County, California, since 2019 and member of the California State Assembly (2002–2008)
- Walter Spitzer (1937–2006), Canadian epidemiologist and professor

== See also ==
- Spitzer Space Telescope
- Spitz (disambiguation)
- Rudolf Lothar (born Rudolf Lothar Spitzer, 1865–1943), Hungarian-born Austrian writer, playwright, critic and essayist
