= Iain S. Duff =

British mathematician and computer scientist

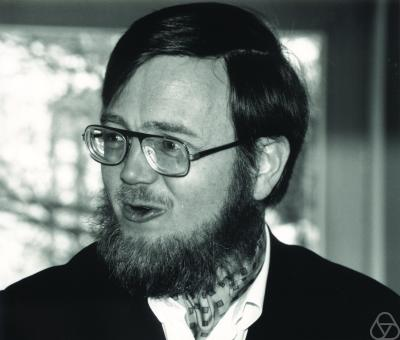
- Iain Duff in 1988; Photo courtesy of MFO
- Born: Glasgow, Scotland
- Education: University of Oxford
- Scientific career
- Fields: Mathematics; Computer science
- Workplaces: Harwell Laboratory
- Doctoral advisor: Leslie Fox; Reginald Prabhakar Tewarson

Iain S. Duff is a British mathematician and computer scientist, known for his work in numerical methods and software for solving problem with sparse matrices, in particular the Harwell Subroutine Library. From 1986 to 2009 he was the Group Leader of Numerical Analysis at Harwell Laboratory, which moved in 1990 to the Rutherford Appleton Laboratory. He is also the Project Leader for the Parallel Algorithms Group at CERFACS in Toulouse.

== See also ==
- MUMPS
- Multifrontal method
