= William Martin Boyce =

American mathematician

- Born: April 21, 1938 (age 88); Florence, South Carolina, U.S.
- Education: Tulane University
- Spouse: Susie B. Boyce
- Scientific career
- Fields: Mathematics; Finance; Computer science
- Workplaces: United States Army; NASA Manned Spaceflight Center; Bell Laboratories; Salomon Brothers
- Thesis: Commuting functions with no common fixed point (1967)
- Doctoral advisor: Gail Sellers Young, Jr.

William Martin Boyce (born April 21, 1938) is an American mathematician, credit analyst, and computer scientist.

== Education and career ==
Boyce received B.A. and M.S. degrees in mathematics from Florida State University in 1959 and 1960, respectively. From 1963 to 1965, Boyce served as an officer in the U.S. Army on the staff of the U.S. Army Security Agency Training Center and School. In 1965, he joined Project Apollo at NASA and was head of the Navigational Analysis Section from 1966 to 1967. He received a Ph.D. in mathematics from Tulane University in 1967.

Boyce's 1967 doctoral thesis addressed the common fixed point problem, resolving an unsolved mathematical problem first posed 13 years earlier by demonstrating the existence of commuting functions without a common fixed point and proving the conjecture to be false. His research involved the concept of Baxter permutations, a term he coined to describe a class of permutations related to the fixed points of commuting functions, based on criteria defined by Glen Baxter in 1963. Boyce developed a FORTRAN program to generate Baxter permutations and search for counterexamples to the common fixed point problem, making this thesis one of the earliest examples of a computer-assisted proof. His 1981 paper, "Baxter Permutations and Functional Composition," explored Baxter permutations beyond the context of commuting functions.

After receiving his Ph.D., Boyce joined Bell Laboratories in 1967. In 1970, he became head of the Mathematics Analysis Department. During his time there, he created an improved computer algorithm for calculating minimal Euclidean Steiner trees, which he published as "STEINER 72" and "STEINER 73".

In the early 1970s, Boyce began to work on stochastic bond pricing models for the Bell System and, in collaboration with Andrew Kalotay, created strategies for optimizing the refunding of callable bonds. In contrast with then-existing strategies, which recommended that an issue be called when rates reached a certain level below the issue's coupon, Boyce and Kalotay showed that it sometimes makes sense to wait, and introduced the notion of refunding efficiency to quantify the value lost when an issue is called too early. Bell System companies applied these strategies and were able to save millions of dollars in financing costs. Boyce and Kalotay described their refunding strategy in their 1979 papers, "Optimum Bond Calling and Refunding" (which was a runner-up for the 1979 Management Science Achievement Award) and "Tax Differentials and Callable Bonds."

Following the Bell System breakup, Kalotay invited Boyce to join him at the investment bank Salomon Brothers.

== Selected publications ==
- Boyce, William M. (March 1969). "Commuting Functions with No Common Fixed Point" (PDF). Transactions of the American Mathematical Society. 137: 77–92. doi:10.1090/S0002-9947-1969-0236331-5.
- Boyce, W. M.; Kalotay, A. J. (1979). "Optimum Bond Calling and Refunding". Interfaces. 9 (5): 36–49. doi:10.1287/inte.9.5.36. ISSN 0092-2102. JSTOR 25059810.
- Boyce, W. M.; Kalotay, A. J. (1979). "Tax Differentials and Callable Bonds". The Journal of Finance. 34 (4): 825–838. doi:10.2307/2327050. ISSN 0022-1082. JSTOR 2327050.
- Boyce, W. M. (1981). "Baxter Permutations and Functional Composition". Houston Journal of Economics. 7 (2).
