= Cuthill =

Cuthill is a surname. Notable people with the surname include:

- Elizabeth Cuthill (1923–2011), American mathematician
- George Cuthill (born 1934), New Zealand footballer
- Michael Cuthill (fl. early 21st century), Australian environmentalist
