= Rota–Baxter algebra =

In mathematics, a Rota–Baxter algebra is an associative algebra, together with a particular linear map $R$ which satisfies the Rota–Baxter identity. It appeared first in the work of the American mathematician Glen E. Baxter in the realm of probability theory. Baxter's work was further explored from different angles by Gian-Carlo Rota, Pierre Cartier, and Frederic V. Atkinson, among others. Baxter’s derivation of this identity that later bore his name emanated from some of the fundamental results of the famous probabilist Frank Spitzer in random walk theory.

In the 1980s, the Rota-Baxter operator of weight 0 in the context of Lie algebras was rediscovered as the operator form of the classical Yang–Baxter equation, named after the well-known physicists Chen-Ning Yang and Rodney Baxter.

The study of Rota–Baxter algebras experienced a renaissance this century, beginning with several developments, in the algebraic approach to renormalization of perturbative quantum field theory, dendriform algebras, associative analogues of the classical Yang–Baxter equation and mixable shuffle product constructions.

== Definition and first properties ==
Let $k$ be a commutative ring and let $\lambda$ be given. A linear operator $R$ on a $k$-algebra $A$ is called a Rota–Baxter operator of weight $\lambda$ if it satisfies the Rota–Baxter relation of weight $\lambda$:

$$R(x)R(y)=R(R(x)y) + R(xR(y)) + \lambda R(xy)$$

for all $x, y \in A$. Then the pair $(A,R)$ or simply $A$ is called a Rota–Baxter algebra of weight $\lambda$. In some literature, $\theta=-\lambda$ is used in which case the above equation becomes

$$R(x)R(y)+\theta R(xy) = R(R(x)y) + R(xR(y)),$$

called the Rota-Baxter equation of weight $\theta$. The terms Baxter operator algebra and Baxter algebra are also used.

Let $R$ be a Rota–Baxter of weight $\lambda$. Then $-\lambda Id - R$ is also a Rota–Baxter operator of weight $\lambda$. Further, for $\mu$ in $k$, $\mu R$ is a Rota-Baxter operator of weight $\mu\lambda$.

== Examples ==
Integration by parts

Integration by parts is an example of a Rota–Baxter algebra of weight 0. Let $C(\mathbb R)$ be the algebra of continuous functions on the set of reals $\mathbb R$. Define the linear map $I\colon C(\mathbb R)\to C(\mathbb R)$ via integration:

$$I(f)(x) = \int_0^x f(t) dt.$$

for a continuous function $f \in C(\mathbb R)$ and $x\in\mathbb R$. For $f,g\in C(\mathbb R)$, let $G = I(g)$ and $F = I(f)$. Then the formula for integration by parts can be written as

$$F(x)G(x) = \int_0^x f(t) G(t) dt + \int_0^x F(t)g(t) dt.$$

In other words

$$I(f)I(g) = I(fI(g)) + I(I(f)g),$$

which shows that $I$ is a Rota–Baxter algebra of weight 0.

== Spitzer's identity ==
Spitzer's identity appeared is named after the American mathematician Frank Spitzer. It is regarded as a remarkable stepping stone in the theory of sums of independent random variables in fluctuation theory of probability. It can naturally be understood in terms of Rota–Baxter operators.
