= Level structure =

Object in graph theory

An example for an undirected Graph with a vertex r and its corresponding level structure

In the mathematical subfield of graph theory a level structure of a rooted graph is a partition of the vertices into subsets that have the same distance from a given root vertex.

== Definition and construction ==
Given a connected graph G = (V, E) with V the set of vertices and E the set of edges, and with a root vertex r, the level structure is a partition of the vertices into subsets L_{i} called levels, consisting of the vertices at distance i from r. Equivalently, this set may be defined by setting L_{0} = {r}, and then, for i > 0, defining L_{i} to be the set of vertices that are neighbors to vertices in L_{i − 1} but are not themselves in any earlier level.

The level structure of a graph can be computed by a variant of breadth-first search:

algorithm level-BFS(G, r):
    Q ← {r}
    for ℓ from 0 to ∞:
        process(Q, ℓ)  // the set Q holds all vertices at level ℓ
        mark all vertices in Q as discovered
        Q' ← {}
        for u in Q:
            for each edge (u, v):
                if v is not yet marked:
                    add v to Q'
        if Q' is empty:
            return
        Q ← Q'

== Properties ==
In a level structure, each edge of G either has both of its endpoints within the same level, or its two endpoints are in consecutive levels.

== Applications ==
The partition of a graph into its level structure may be used as a heuristic for graph layout problems such as graph bandwidth. The Cuthill–McKee algorithm is a refinement of this idea, based on an additional sorting step within each level.

Level structures are also used in algorithms for sparse matrices, and for constructing separators of planar graphs.
