= Cennamo =

Cennamo (pronounced [ˈtʃennamo]) is an Italian surname derived from Old Italian for 'cinnamon' (Latin cinnamum), probably applied as a metonymic occupational name for a spicer. Notable people with the surname include:

- Louis Cennamo (born 1946), English bass guitarist
- Luigi Cennamo (born 1980), Greek-Italian-German footballer
- Mary Robison (née Cennamo; born 1949), American short story writer and novelist
- Tony Cennamo (1933–2010), American jazz disc jockey
