= Mumps (disambiguation) =

Mumps is a viral disease.

Mumps or MUMPS may also refer to:

== Places ==
- Oldham Mumps, a district in Oldham, Greater Manchester
- Oldham Mumps railway station, a railway station on the Oldham Loop Line, now converted to Manchester Metrolink and known as Oldham Mumps Metrolink station

== Art, entertainment, and media ==
- Mumps, an unwanted optical effect in Cinemascope films, in which an actor's face appears to stretch horizontally as the face gets in closer to the camera
- Mumps (rock band), a band led by Lance Loud

== Computing ==
- MUMPS (software), a numeric linear algebra software for parallel computers
- MUMPS (or M), a computer programming language
