= Wiener sausage =

Mathematical concept

A long, thin Wiener sausage in 3 dimensions

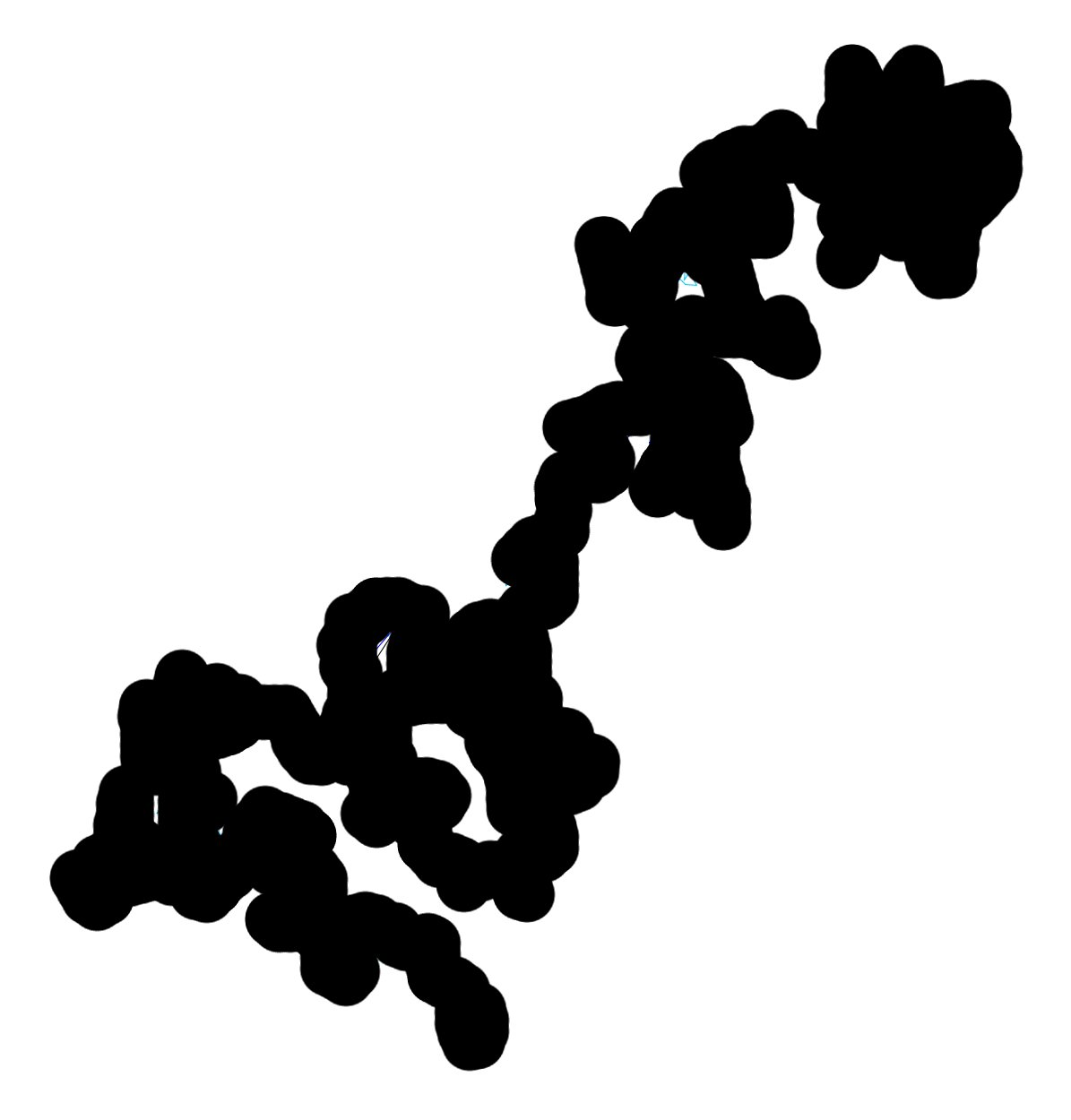
A short, fat Wiener sausage in 2 dimensions

In the mathematical field of probability, the Wiener sausage is a neighborhood of the trace of a Brownian motion up to a time t, given by taking all points within a fixed distance of Brownian motion. It can be visualized as a sausage of fixed radius whose centerline is Brownian motion. The Wiener sausage was named after Norbert Wiener by M. D. Donsker and S. R. Srinivasa Varadhan (1975) because of its relation to the Wiener process; the name is also a pun on Vienna sausage, as "Wiener" is German for "Viennese".

The Wiener sausage is one of the simplest non-Markovian functionals of Brownian motion. Its applications include stochastic phenomena including heat conduction. It was first described by Frank Spitzer (1964), and it was used by Mark Kac and Joaquin Mazdak Luttinger (1973, 1974) to explain results of a Bose–Einstein condensate, with proofs published by M. D. Donsker and S. R. Srinivasa Varadhan (1975).

== Definitions ==
The Wiener sausage W_{δ}(t) of radius δ and length t is the set-valued random variable on Brownian paths b (in some Euclidean space) defined by

$W_\delta(t)({ b})$ is the set of points within a distance δ of some point b(x) of the path b with 0≤x≤t.

== Volume ==
There has been a lot of work on the behavior of the volume (Lebesgue measure) |W_{δ}(t)| of the Wiener sausage as it becomes thin (δ→0); by rescaling, this is essentially equivalent to studying the volume as the sausage becomes long (t→∞).

Spitzer (1964) showed that in 3 dimensions the expected value of the volume of the sausage is

$$E(|W_\delta(t)|) = 2\pi\delta t + 4\delta^2\sqrt{2\pi t} +4\pi\delta^3/3.$$

In dimension d at least 3 the volume of the Wiener sausage is asymptotic to

$$\delta^{d-2} \pi^{d/2}2t/\Gamma((d-2)/2)$$

as t tends to infinity. In dimensions 1 and 2 this formula gets replaced by $\sqrt{8t/\pi}$ and $2{\pi}t/\log(t)$ respectively. Whitman (1964), a student of Spitzer, proved similar results for generalizations of Wiener sausages with cross sections given by more general compact sets than balls.
