= UMFPACK =

- Developer: Timothy A. Davis
- Release: January 1994
- Stable release: 6.3.5 / March 6, 2025; 16 months ago
- Written in: C
- Type: Mathematics, linear Algebra
- License: GPL-2.0-or-later
- Website: people.engr.tamu.edu/davis/suitesparse.html
- Repository: github.com/DrTimothyAldenDavis/SuiteSparse

UMFPACK (/ˈʌmfpæk/) is a set of routines for solving unsymmetric sparse linear systems of the form Ax=b, using the Unsymmetric MultiFrontal method (Matrix A is not required to be symmetric). Written in ANSI/ISO C and interfaces with

- MATLAB version 6.0 and later
- SciPy, and thus SciPy-relied software FuncDesigner, SageMath, PythonXY

It appears as a built-in routine (for lu, backslash, and forward slash) in MATLAB, and includes a MATLAB interface, a C-callable interface, and a Fortran-callable interface. Note that "UMFPACK" is pronounced in two syllables, "Umph Pack". It is not "You Em Ef Pack".

UMFPACK has installation options to use the many versions of the BLAS, or no BLAS at all. BLAS is what UMFPACK relies on, to get high performance on a wide range of computers.

Versions 1 and 1.1 were in Fortran 77 (Jan. 1995) and are licensed for non-commercial only. Version 2.2 appears as the Fortran package MA38 in the Harwell Subroutine Library. Versions 3 (March 2001) to 5.1 (May 2007) are licensed under the LGPL license. Versions 5.2 (Nov 2007) to date are licensed under the GPL license, with alternative commercial licenses available as well.

== See also ==
- MUMPS A free implementation of multifrontal method for sparse matrices.
- List of open-source mathematical libraries
