= Random band matrix =

Random band matrices are random matrices that are also band matrices, meaning that their non-zero entries are confined to a diagonal band, comprising the main diagonal and zero or more diagonals on each side. They can be used to roughly model systems of interacting particles arranged roughly in a grid such that each particle is only allowed to interact with its neighbors, which is an improvement on the mean field model, corresponding to random Gaussian matrices, where no entries are necessarily zero and every particle interacts with every other.

In one dimension, this means that $H_{ij} = 0$ if $|i - j| > W$, where W is the band width. Physically, this means that the amount by which particles i and j interact is 0 if their separation is over W. In more than one dimension, i and j are no longer integers but nd vectors with integer components, and $H_{ij} = 0$ if $|i - j|_{L^1}$, where $|\cdot|_{L^1}$ indicates the taxicab distance between the two locations.

== Anderson's model ==
Random band matrices are relevant to the study of Anderson's model of electron localization, which attempts to explain why metals with small amounts of impurities added hit a sudden transition where they cease to be conductive and start to insulate. The interaction potentials of certain particles i, j, in the model form a matrix; specifically a band matrix, as particles only interact with their neighbors. Anderson's matrices always have a thin band. However, as only some of the entries in Anderson's model are random, it is not a random band matrix. The study of random band matrices, however, is related.
