= Robert Horton Cameron =

American mathematician (1908-1989)

- Born: May 17, 1908; Brooklyn, New York, USA
- Died: July 17, 1989 (aged 81); Minneapolis, Minnesota, USA
- Education: Cornell University
- Known for: Cameron–Martin theorem
- Awards: Chauvenet Prize (1944)
- Scientific career
- Fields: mathematician
- Workplaces: MIT; University of Minnesota
- Thesis: Almost Periodic Transformations (1932)
- Doctoral advisor: W. A. Hurwitz
- Doctoral students: Elizabeth Cuthill; Monroe D. Donsker

Robert Horton Cameron (May 17, 1908 – July 17, 1989) was an American mathematician, who worked on analysis and probability theory. He is known for the Cameron–Martin theorem.

== Education and career ==
Cameron received his Ph.D. in 1932 from Cornell University under the direction of W. A. Hurwitz. He studied under a National Research Council postdoc at the Institute for Advanced Study in Princeton from 1933 to 1935. Cameron was a faculty member at MIT from 1935 to 1945. He was then a faculty member at the University of Minnesota until his retirement. He spent the academic year 1953–1954 on sabbatical leave at the Institute for Advanced Study. His doctoral students include Monroe D. Donsker and Elizabeth Cuthill. He had a total of 35 Ph.D. students at the University of Minnesota — his first two graduated in 1946 and his last one in 1977. Cameron published a total of 72 papers — his first in 1934 and his last, posthumously, in 1990.

At MIT, he did some work with Norbert Wiener. During the 1940s Cameron and W. T. Martin, who was from 1943 to 1946 the chair of the mathematics department at Syracuse University, engaged in an ambitious program of extending Norbert Wiener's early work on mathematical models of Brownian motion. In 1944, Cameron was awarded the Chauvenet Prize for '"Some Introductory Exercises in the Manipulation of Fourier Transforms", which appeared in National Mathematics Magazine, 1941, vol. 15, pages 331–356.
