= Wallie Abraham Hurwitz =

American mathematician (1886-1958)

- Zürich 1932
- Born: February 18, 1886; Joplin, Missouri, US
- Died: January 6, 1958 (aged 71); Ithaca, New York, US
- Education: University of Göttingen; Harvard University; University of Missouri
- Scientific career
- Fields: Mathematics
- Workplaces: Cornell University
- Doctoral advisor: David Hilbert
- Doctoral students: Robert Horton Cameron; Florence Marie Mears

Wallie Abraham Hurwitz (February 18, 1886 in Joplin, Missouri – January 6, 1958 in Ithaca, New York) was an American mathematician who worked on analysis.

Hurwitz graduated from the University of Missouri with a bachelor's degree and then went to Harvard to do graduate work. He won a Sheldon Traveling Fellowship, which enabled him to study at the University of Göttingen, where he earned a doctoral degree under Hilbert in 1910. In 1912 Hurwitz joined the mathematics faculty of Cornell University, where he remained until he died in 1958 at age seventy-one. His doctoral students include R. H. Cameron and Florence M. Mears.

Hurwitz's private library contained nearly three thousand books. This private library had many books on cryptography, several of which were borrowed by the U. S. Navy early in WWII because there were no copies of them in the Library of Congress. Hurwitz had an extensive knowledge of music and a large collection of Gilbert and Sullivan scores, reviews, programs, and related memorabilia. He invested brilliantly in the stock market, selling out shortly before the 1929 crash and buying in close to the bottom. Hurwitz left his considerable financial estate to the U. of Missouri, Harvard, and Cornell.

== Publications ==
- with R. G. D. Richardson: Richardson, R. G. D.; Hurwitz, W. A. (1909). "Note on determinants whose forms are certain integrals". Bull. Amer. Math. Soc. 16 (1): 14–19. doi:10.1090/s0002-9904-1909-01844-0. MR 1558831.
- Hurwitz, Wallie Abraham (1912). "On the pseudo-resolvent to the kernel of an integral equation". Trans. Amer. Math. Soc. 13 (4): 405–418. doi:10.1090/s0002-9947-1912-1500925-9. MR 1500925.
- Hurwitz, W. A. (1912). "Note on mixed linear equations". Bull. Amer. Math. Soc. 18 (6): 291–294. doi:10.1090/s0002-9904-1912-02210-3. MR 1559206.
- Hurwitz, W. A. (1914). "Note on the Fredholm determinant". Bull. Amer. Math. Soc. 20 (8): 406–408. doi:10.1090/s0002-9904-1914-02510-8. MR 1559509.
- Hurwitz, Wallie Abraham (1915). "Mixed linear integral equations of the first order". Trans. Amer. Math. Soc. 16 (2): 121–133. doi:10.1090/s0002-9947-1915-1501004-x. MR 1501004.
- with Louis Lazarus Silverman: Hurwitz, Wallie Abraham; Silverman, L. L. (1917). "On the consistency and equivalence of certain definitions of summability". Trans. Amer. Math. Soc. 18 (1): 1–20. doi:10.1090/s0002-9947-1917-1501058-2. MR 1501058.
- Hurwitz, Wallie Abraham (1921). "An expansion theorem for a system of linear differential equations of the first order". Trans. Amer. Math. Soc. 22 (4): 526–543. doi:10.1090/s0002-9947-1921-1501184-9. MR 1501184.
- Hurwitz, W. A. (1922). "Report on topics in the theory of divergent series". Bull. Amer. Math. Soc. 28 (1–2): 17–36. doi:10.1090/s0002-9904-1922-03502-1. MR 1560496.
- Hurwitz, W. A. (1925). "Characteristic parameter values for an integral equation". Bull. Amer. Math. Soc. 31 (9–10): 503–508. doi:10.1090/s0002-9904-1925-04092-6. MR 1561106.
- Hurwitz, W. A. (1926). "A trivial Tauberian theorem". Bull. Amer. Math. Soc. 32 (1): 77–82. doi:10.1090/s0002-9904-1926-04166-5. MR 1561159.
- Hurwitz, Wallie Abraham (1928). "On Bell's arithmetic of Boolean algebra". Trans. Amer. Math. Soc. 30 (2): 420–424. doi:10.1090/s0002-9947-1928-1501435-7. MR 1501435.
- with David Clinton Gillespie: Gillespie, D. C.; Hurwitz, W. A. (1930). "On sequences of continuous functions having continuous limits". Trans. Amer. Math. Soc. 32 (3): 527–543. doi:10.1090/s0002-9947-1930-1501551-9. MR 1501551.
