= Raphael Hillyer =

American musician (1914–2010)

- Born: Raphael Silverman; April 10, 1914; Ithaca, New York
- Died: December 27, 2010 (aged 96); Boston
- Education: Curtis Institute of Music and Dartmouth College
- Known for: Viola soloist, Juilliard String Quartet

Raphael Hillyer (April 10, 1914 – December 27, 2010) was a Jewish American viola soloist, teacher. Born Raphael Silverman in Ithaca, New York, his career included playing in the Boston Symphony Orchestra and co-founding the Juilliard String Quartet. Hillyer was still lecturing and teaching viola at Boston University during the final month of his life.

== Career ==
Hillyer was a founding member of the Juilliard String Quartet. He was born in 1914 to a family with a musical background: his mother was a pianist and his father, Louis Lazarus Silverman, also was an amateur violist. Hillyer's formal violin studies began in 1921, and his youthful passion for music was further ignited on a trip with his parents in 1924 to Leningrad, Russia where he studied with Sergei Korgueff and an 18-year-old Dmitri Shostakovich. At the age of 16 Hillyer attended the Curtis Institute of Music, followed by studies at Dartmouth College, from which he graduated Phi Beta Kappa with a mathematics degree in 1936. He then completed graduate work in music under Walter Piston and Hugo Leichtentritt at Harvard University, where he played frequent recitals with his friend and classmate, Leonard Bernstein.

In 1942, Hillyer joined the Boston Symphony Orchestra as a violinist under Serge Koussevitsky and played with the Stradivari Quartet alongside Boston Symphony violist, Eugene Lehner, who became his mentor. In 1946, at the urging of Lehner, Hillyer, until then a violinist, prepared for an audition with a new quartet that was in need of a violist. With a borrowed viola and an intensity for which he was becoming well known, Hillyer played the audition and was chosen to be the violist and founding member of what became the Juilliard String Quartet. Hillyer remained with the Juilliard String Quartet for 23 years, recording, teaching and concertizing—championing new music and reinvigorating chamber music. After retiring from the Juilliard String Quartet in 1969, Hillyer performed frequently as soloist and collaborator with other chamber music groups. He also intensified the work he had grown passionate about: teaching and mentoring young musicians throughout the world. He was a guiding force behind the Tokyo String Quartet for decades. Hillyer continued to teach at Boston University until his death. On December 6, 2010, he taught his very last class, which was described by those in attendance as "as passionate and illuminating as any he had ever taught."
