= Regular matrix =

Regular matrix may refer to:

== Mathematics ==
- Regular stochastic matrix, a stochastic matrix such that all the entries of some power of the matrix are positive
- The opposite of irregular matrix, a matrix with a different number of entries in each row
- Regular Hadamard matrix, a Hadamard matrix whose row and column sums are all equal
- A regular element of a Lie algebra, when the Lie algebra is gl_{n}
- Invertible matrix (this usage is rare)

== Other uses ==
- QS Regular Matrix, a quadraphonic sound system developed by Sansui Electric
