= Florence Marie Mears =

American mathematician (1896-1995)

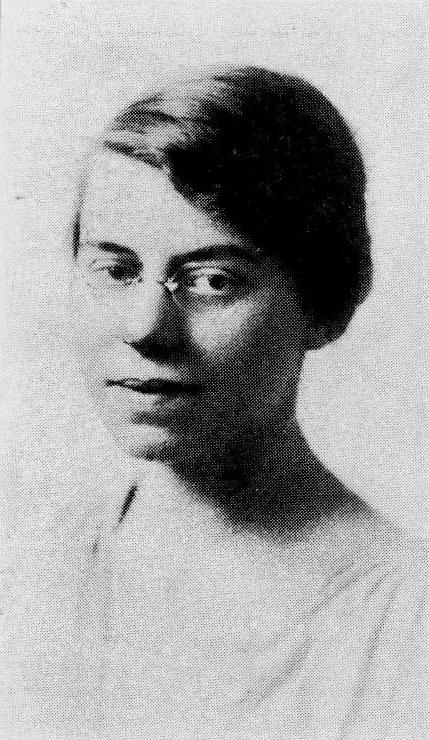
Mears from a 1918 Goucher College yearbook

Florence Marie Mears (May 18, 1896 – December 3, 1995) was a professor of Mathematics at The George Washington University.

== Background and education ==
Mears was born in Baltimore, Maryland and attended Baltimore public schools. She received her undergraduate degree in mathematics at Goucher College, earning a Phi Beta Kappa Key. She received a master's degree from Cornell University in 1924 after completing her thesis on "A Special Function of One Variable." She then went on to achieve her doctorate from Cornell in 1927, completing her thesis on the "Riesz Summability for Double Series" (published in Transactions of the American Mathematical Society in 1928)^{[M28]} with thesis advisor Wallie Abraham Hurwitz.

== Career ==
Mears's first job as a college professor was at the Women's College of Alabama; she soon left to become an associate professor of mathematics at Pennsylvania State College, and then joined The George Washington University in 1929.

At George Washington University, Mears was known for her popularity among both her students and fellow faculty members. She was considered by the university's president as "one of the greatest teachers of mathematics in the entire country." During her first year at The George Washington University, Mears taught as an assistant professor of mathematics in the Columbian College of Arts and Sciences. Her office could be found directly on campus at 2033 G Street. At the beginning of her career at GW, Mears was the only woman in the Mathematics department, which included seven other professors. Additionally, it was reported that she was paid substantially less than her male co-workers.

Mears earned the title of being a master teacher. According to the criteria set by the Columbian College of Arts and Sciences, Mears earned this title due to her excellent teaching skills, and her contributions in both research and the Mathematics Department. Among the many classes that she taught were Advanced Calculus, Introduction to Analysis, Introduction to Infinite Series, and Fourier Series and Spherical Harmonics. In 1955, George Washington University awarded her an Alumni Citation for twenty-five years of distinguished service. In 1958, the University of California selected her as one of ten female mathematicians to work on a project studying creativity. In 1962, she became a member of an examining committee, which focused on selecting doctoral dissertations in mathematics for the University of Allahabad in India.

Mears specialized in the findings of definitions and values assigned to various infinite series of numbers. An "infinite series" is an endless series of numbers, each succeeding the other that is a certain amount lesser or greater than the proceeding one. An example set of an infinite series includes is 1 + ½ + ¼ etc. in which the definition of the series can be defined as the number two. As a result, Mears created several theorems about these definitions, many of which provided truth for many practicing mathematicians, engineers, chemists, physicists, and astronomers. One of her most popular theorems, called the Norlund Mean can be explained through absolute regularity, the summability of Cauchy products, and inverse properties.

== Awards ==
Mears' participation in professional, honorary, and civic organizations included a professional membership in the American Math Society, and in the American Math Association. Her various honorary memberships included the Washington Academy of Science, Phi Beta Kappa (1927), Phi Kappa Phi (1927), and Sigma XI (1924). Additionally, she held several fellowships at Cornell University during the years 1925 to 1927. Mears also published several articles and book reviews in leading mathematical journals.

== Students ==
Mears helped Janos Edvard Hanson and Joseph Blum earn their Ph.D.s from the George Washington University. Joseph Blum earned his Ph.D. in 1958 following his completion of his dissertation on Banach Spaces Functionals and Matrix Summability Method. Two years later, Mears would also aid Janos Edvard Hanson in earning his Ph.D. in 1960, after writing his final dissertation on Linear Sequence Spaces, which permit omission and adjunction and have Finite Dimension Modulo Convergence.

== Legacy ==
Mears was named professor emerita of Mathematics in 1965. A professor emeritus or emeritus professor is a title that may be given to a full professor who retires in good standing. According to the American Council on Education it is typically awarded for "long and distinguished service". She is considered not only one of The George Washington University's greatest mathematicians, but also one of the finest and most active mathematicians in the United States of America. Mears died on December 3, 1995.

== Selected publications ==
M28.	Mears, Florence M. (1928). "Riesz Summability for Double Series". Trans. Amer. Math. Soc. 30 (4): 686–709. doi:10.1090/s0002-9947-1928-1501454-0. MR 1501454.

M35.	Mears, Florence M. (1935). "Some Multiplication Theorems for the Nörlund mean". Bulletin of the American Mathematical Society. 41 (12): 875–880. doi:10.1090/s0002-9904-1935-06212-3.
