= Tridiagonal matrix =

Matrix with nonzero elements on the main diagonal and the diagonals above and below it

In linear algebra, a tridiagonal matrix is a band matrix that has nonzero elements only on the main diagonal, the subdiagonal/lower diagonal (the first diagonal below this), and the supradiagonal/upper diagonal (the first diagonal above the main diagonal). For example, the following matrix is tridiagonal:

$$\begin{pmatrix}
1 & 4 & 0 & 0 \\
3 & 4 & 1 & 0 \\
0 & 2 & 3 & 4 \\
0 & 0 & 1 & 3 \\
\end{pmatrix}.$$

The determinant of a tridiagonal matrix is given by the continuant of its elements.

An orthogonal transformation of a symmetric (or Hermitian) matrix to tridiagonal form can be done with the Lanczos algorithm.

== Properties ==
A tridiagonal matrix is a matrix that is both upper and lower Hessenberg matrix. In particular, a tridiagonal matrix is a direct sum of p 1-by-1 and q 2-by-2 matrices such that p + q/2 = n — the dimension of the tridiagonal. Although a general tridiagonal matrix is not necessarily symmetric or Hermitian, many of those that arise when solving linear algebra problems have one of these properties. Furthermore, if a real tridiagonal matrix A satisfies a_{k,k+1} a_{k+1,k} > 0 for all k, so that the signs of its entries are symmetric, then it is similar to a Hermitian matrix, by a diagonal change of basis matrix. Hence, its eigenvalues are real. If we replace the strict inequality by a_{k,k+1} a_{k+1,k} ≥ 0, then by continuity, the eigenvalues are still guaranteed to be real, but the matrix need no longer be similar to a Hermitian matrix.

The set of all n × n tridiagonal matrices forms a 3n-2 dimensional vector space.

Many linear algebra algorithms require significantly less computational effort when applied to diagonal matrices, and this improvement often carries over to tridiagonal matrices as well.

=== Determinant ===
The determinant of a tridiagonal matrix A of order n can be computed from a three-term recurrence relation. Write f_{1} = |a_{1}| = a_{1} (i.e., f_{1} is the determinant of the 1 by 1 matrix consisting only of a_{1}), and let

$$f_n = \begin{vmatrix}
a_1 & b_1 \\
c_1 & a_2 & b_2 \\
& c_2 & \ddots & \ddots \\
& & \ddots & \ddots & b_{n-1} \\
& & & c_{n-1} & a_n
\end{vmatrix}.$$

The sequence (f_{i}) is called the continuant and satisfies the recurrence relation

$$f_n = a_n f_{n-1} - c_{n-1}b_{n-1}f_{n-2}$$

with initial values f_{0} = 1 and f_{−1} = 0. The cost of computing the determinant of a tridiagonal matrix using this formula is linear in n, while the cost is cubic for a general matrix.

=== Inversion ===
The inverse of a non-singular tridiagonal matrix T

$$T = \begin{pmatrix}
a_1 & b_1 \\
c_1 & a_2 & b_2 \\
& c_2 & \ddots & \ddots \\
& & \ddots & \ddots & b_{n-1} \\
& & & c_{n-1} & a_n
\end{pmatrix}$$

is given by

$$(T^{-1})_{ij} = \begin{cases}
(-1)^{i+j}b_i \cdots b_{j-1} \theta_{i-1} \phi_{j+1}/\theta_n & \text{ if } i < j\\
\theta_{i-1} \phi_{j+1}/\theta_n & \text{ if } i = j\\
(-1)^{i+j}c_j \cdots c_{i-1} \theta_{j-1} \phi_{i+1}/\theta_n & \text{ if } i > j\\
\end{cases}$$

where the θ_{i} satisfy the recurrence relation

$$\theta_i = a_i \theta_{i-1} - b_{i-1}c_{i-1}\theta_{i-2} \qquad i=2,3,\ldots,n$$

with initial conditions θ_{0} = 1, θ_{1} = a_{1} and the ϕ_{i} satisfy

$$\phi_i = a_i \phi_{i+1} - b_i c_i \phi_{i+2} \qquad i=n-1,\ldots,1$$

with initial conditions ϕ_{n+1} = 1 and ϕ_{n} = a_{n}.

Closed form solutions can be computed for special cases such as symmetric matrices with all diagonal and off-diagonal elements equal or Toeplitz matrices and for the general case as well.

In general, the inverse of a tridiagonal matrix is a semiseparable matrix and vice versa. The inverse of a symmetric tridiagonal matrix can be written as a single-pair matrix (a.k.a. generator-representable semiseparable matrix) of the form

$$\begin{pmatrix}
\alpha_1 & -\beta_1 \\
-\beta_1  & \alpha_2 & -\beta_2 \\
& \ddots & \ddots & \ddots & \\
& & \ddots & \ddots & -\beta_{n-1} \\
& & & -\beta_{n-1} & \alpha_n
\end{pmatrix}^{-1} =
\begin{pmatrix}
a_1 b_1 & a_1 b_2 & \cdots & a_1 b_n \\
a_1 b_2 & a_2 b_2 & \cdots & a_2 b_n \\
\vdots  & \vdots & \ddots & \vdots \\
a_1 b_n & a_2 b_n & \cdots & a_n b_n
\end{pmatrix}
= \left( a_{\min(i,j)} b_{\max(i,j)} \right)$$

where
$$\begin{cases} \displaystyle a_i = \frac{\beta_{i} \cdots \beta_{n-1}}{\delta_i \cdots \delta_n\,b_n}
\\ \displaystyle
b_i = \frac{\beta_1 \cdots \beta_{i-1}}{d_1 \cdots d_i}\end{cases}$$
with
$$\begin{cases}
d_n = \alpha_n,\quad d_{i-1} = \alpha_{i-1} - \frac{\beta_{i-1}^2}{d_{i}}, & i = n, n-1, \cdots, 2,
\\
\delta_1 = \alpha_1, \quad
\delta_{i+1} = \alpha_{i+1} - \frac{\beta_{i}^2}{\delta_{i}}, & i = 1, 2, \cdots, n-1.
\end{cases}$$

=== Solution of linear system ===
A system of equations Ax = b for $b\in \R^n$ can be solved by an efficient form of Gaussian elimination when A is tridiagonal called tridiagonal matrix algorithm, requiring O(n) operations.

=== Eigenvalues ===
When a tridiagonal matrix is also Toeplitz, there is a simple closed-form solution for its eigenvalues, namely:

$$a - 2 \sqrt{bc} \cos \left (\frac{k\pi}{n+1} \right ), \qquad k=1, \ldots, n.$$

A real symmetric tridiagonal matrix has real eigenvalues, and all the eigenvalues are distinct (simple) if all off-diagonal elements are nonzero. Numerous methods exist for the numerical computation of the eigenvalues of a real symmetric tridiagonal matrix to arbitrary finite precision, typically requiring $O(n^2)$ operations for a matrix of size $n\times n$, although fast algorithms exist which (without parallel computation) require only $O(n\log n)$.

As a side note, an unreduced symmetric tridiagonal matrix is a matrix containing non-zero off-diagonal elements of the tridiagonal, where the eigenvalues are distinct while the eigenvectors are unique up to a scale factor and are mutually orthogonal.

=== Similarity to symmetric tridiagonal matrix ===
For unsymmetric or nonsymmetric tridiagonal matrices one can compute the eigendecomposition using a similarity transformation. Given a real tridiagonal, nonsymmetric matrix

$$T = \begin{pmatrix}
a_1 & b_1 \\
c_1 & a_2 & b_2 \\
& c_2 & \ddots & \ddots \\
& & \ddots & \ddots & b_{n-1} \\
& & & c_{n-1} & a_n
\end{pmatrix}$$

where $b_i \neq c_i$. Assume that each product of off-diagonal entries is strictly positive $b_i c_i > 0$ and define a transformation matrix $D$ by

$$D := \operatorname{diag}(\delta_1 , \dots, \delta_n)
\quad \text{for} \quad
\delta_i :=
\begin{cases}
1 & , \, i=1
\\
\sqrt{\frac{c_{i-1} \dots c_1}{b_{i-1} \dots b_1}} & , \, i=2,\dots,n \,.
\end{cases}$$

The similarity transformation $D^{-1} T D$ yields a symmetric tridiagonal matrix $J$ by:

$$J:=D^{-1} T D
= \begin{pmatrix}
a_1 & \sgn b_1 \,  \sqrt{b_1 c_1} \\
\sgn b_1 \, \sqrt{b_1 c_1} & a_2 & \sgn b_2 \, \sqrt{b_2 c_2} \\
& \sgn b_2 \,  \sqrt{b_2 c_2} & \ddots & \ddots \\
& & \ddots & \ddots & \sgn b_{n-1} \, \sqrt{b_{n-1} c_{n-1}} \\
& & & \sgn b_{n-1} \,  \sqrt{b_{n-1} c_{n-1}} & a_n
\end{pmatrix} \,.$$

Note that $T$ and $J$ have the same eigenvalues.

== Computer programming ==
A transformation that reduces a general matrix to Hessenberg form will reduce a Hermitian matrix to tridiagonal form. So, many eigenvalue algorithms, when applied to a Hermitian matrix, reduce the input Hermitian matrix to (symmetric real) tridiagonal form as a first step.

A tridiagonal matrix can also be stored more efficiently than a general matrix by using a special storage scheme. For instance, the LAPACK Fortran package stores an unsymmetric tridiagonal matrix of order n in three one-dimensional arrays, one of length n containing the diagonal elements, and two of length n − 1 containing the subdiagonal and superdiagonal elements.

== Applications ==
The discretization in space of the one-dimensional diffusion or heat equation

$$\frac{\partial u(t,x)}{\partial t} = \alpha \frac{\partial^2 u(t,x)}{\partial x^2}$$

using second order central finite differences with Dirichlet boundary condition results in

$$\begin{pmatrix}
\frac{\partial u_{1}(t)}{\partial t} \\
\frac{\partial u_{2}(t)}{\partial t} \\
\vdots \\
\frac{\partial u_{N}(t)}{\partial t}
\end{pmatrix}
= \frac{\alpha}{\Delta x^2} \begin{pmatrix}
-2 & 1 &  &  &  \\
1 & -2 & 1 & &  \\
& 1 & \ddots & \ddots & \\
& & \ddots & \ddots & 1 \\
&  &  & 1 & -2
\end{pmatrix}
\begin{pmatrix}
u_{1}(t) \\
u_{2}(t) \\
\vdots \\
u_{N}(t) \\
\end{pmatrix}$$

with discretization constant $\Delta x$. The matrix is tridiagonal with $a_{i}=-2$ and $b_{i}=c_{i}=1$, and so is also a Toeplitz matrix.

When considering instead Neumann boundary condition, the second derivative operator is approximated by the matrix
$$\begin{pmatrix}
-1 & 1 \\
1 & -2 & 1 \\
& 1 & \ddots & \ddots \\
& & \ddots & \ddots & 1 \\
& & & 1 & -1
\end{pmatrix}$$
which is tridiagonal but not Toeplitz.

Note that when considering Periodic boundary conditions, the discretization of the second derivative operator gives rise to a matrix that is not tridiagonal, even if the same stencil is used.

== See also ==
- Pentadiagonal matrix
- Jacobi matrix (operator)
