= Harwell-Boeing file format =

- Filename extension: .hb
- Type of format: Sparse matrix

The Harwell-Boeing file format is a file format designed to store sparse matrices, first described in 1982 as the format for the Harwell-Boeing collection of sparse matrix test problems.

== See also ==
- Matrix Market exchange formats
