= W. T. Martin =

American mathematician (1911–2004)

- Born: June 4, 1911; Arkansas
- Died: May 30, 2004 (aged 92)
- Education: University of Illinois Urbana-Champaign
- Scientific career
- Fields: Mathematics
- Thesis: On Expansions in Terms of a Certain General Class of Functions (1934)
- Doctoral advisor: Robert Carmichael

William Ted Martin (June 4, 1911 – May 30, 2004) was an American mathematician, who worked on mathematical analysis, several complex variables, and probability theory. He is known for the Cameron–Martin theorem and for his 1948 book Several complex variables, co-authored with Salomon Bochner.

== Biography ==
He was born on June 4, 1911, in Arkansas.

W. T. Martin received his B.A. in mathematics from the University of Arkansas in 1930. He did graduate work at the University of Illinois Urbana-Champaign, where he received his M.A. in 1931 and his Ph.D. in 1934 under the direction of Robert Carmichael. He studied under a National Research Council postdoctoral fellowship at the Institute for Advanced Study in Princeton from 1934 to 1936. In 1936 Martin became an instructor at Massachusetts Institute of Technology and in 1938 a faculty member there. He collaborated with several fellow MIT faculty members, notably Norbert Wiener, R. H. Cameron, Stefan Bergman, and Salomon Bochner. During the 1940s Martin and R. H. Cameron wrote a series of papers extending Norbert Wiener's early work on mathematical models of Brownian motion. During the 1950s W. T. Martin wrote with Salomon Bochner a series of papers that proved basic results in the theory of several complex variables.

Martin was the department head for the MIT mathematics department from 1947 to 1968. During this time he oversaw the hiring of 24 faculty members in the mathematics department. He initiated MIT's C. L. E. Moore Instructorship Program in 1949. He spent his entire career at MIT, except for the years from 1943 to 1946, when he left MIT to become the head of the mathematics department of Syracuse University and, in the academic year 1951–1952, when he was on sabbatical at the Institute for Advanced Study. Martin did important editorial work and co-authored three influential books: Several complex variables (1948), Elementary differential equations (1956), and Differential space, quantum space, and prediction (1966). Beginning in 1961, Martin involved himself in developing math curricula for English-speaking African nations, serving as chair of the Steering Committee of the Education Development Center's African Mathematics Program and visited Africa regularly from 1961 to 1975.

He retired to Block Island and died on May 30, 2004.

== Selected publications ==
- with Norbert Wiener: Wiener, N.; Martin, W. T. (1937). "Taylor's series of entire functions of smooth growth". Duke Math. J. 3 (2): 213–223. doi:10.1215/s0012-7094-37-00314-4. MR 1545980.
- with Norbert Wiener: "Taylor's series of smooth growth in the unit circle". Duke Math. J. 4 (2): 384–392. 1938. doi:10.1215/s0012-7094-38-00430-2. MR 1546059.
- with Stefan Bergman: Bergman, Stefan; Martin, W. T. (1940). "A modified moment problem in two variables". Duke Math. J. 6 (2): 389–407. doi:10.1215/s0012-7094-40-00630-5. MR 0001993.
- Martin, W. T. (1944). "Mappings by means of systems of analytic functions of several complex variables". Bull. Amer. Math. Soc. 50 (1): 5–19. doi:10.1090/s0002-9904-1944-08043-9. MR 0009641.
- with R. H. Cameron: Cameron, R. H.; Martin, W. T. (1944). "Transformations of Wiener integrals under translations". The Annals of Mathematics. 45 (2): 386–396. doi:10.2307/1969276. JSTOR 1969276. (2nd most cited of all Cameron and Martin's papers)
- with R. H. Cameron: Cameron, R. H.; Martin, W. T. (1947). "The orthogonal development of non-linear functionals in series of Fourier–Hermite functionals". The Annals of Mathematics. 48 (2): 385–392. doi:10.2307/1969178. JSTOR 1969178. (most cited of all Cameron and Martin's papers)
- with Salomon Bochner: Several complex variables. Princeton, N. J.: Princeton University Press. 1948. (216 pages)
- with Eric Reissner: Elementary differential equations. Cambridge, Massachusetts: Addison-Wesley. 1956, 260 pages; 2nd edn. Reading, Mass.: Addison-Wesley. 1961, 331 pages; Reprinting of 2nd edn. NY: Dover. 1986. ISBN 0486650243.
- as co-editor with editors Norbert Wiener, Armand Siegel, and Bayard Rankin: Differential space, quantum systems, and prediction. Cambridge, Massachusetts: M.I.T. Press. 1966. (176 pages, essays)
