= Simon Spitzer =

Austrian mathematician

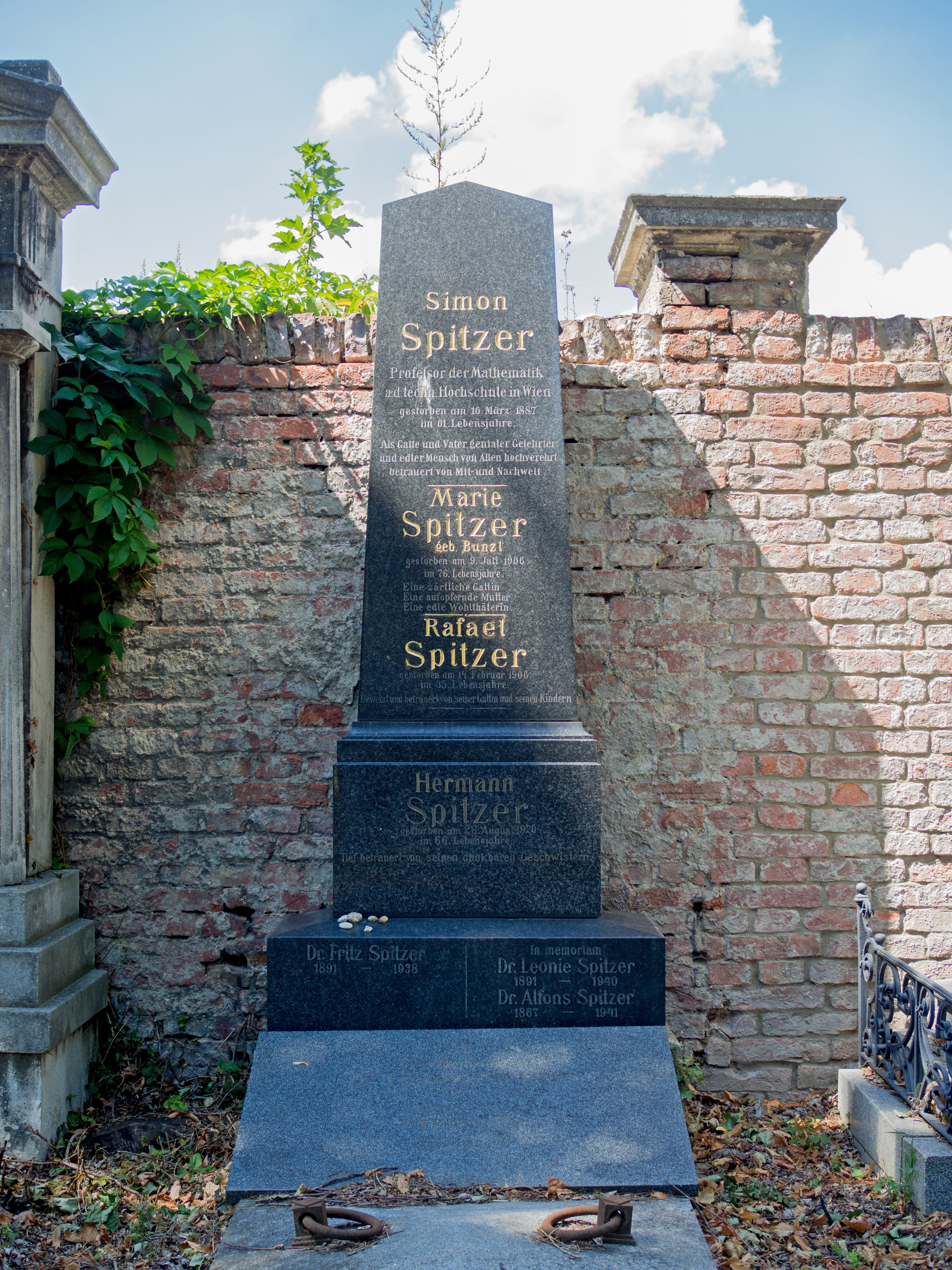
- Spitzer and his family's grave at the Old Jewish Cemetery in Vienna
- Born: 3 February 1826; Vienna, Austrian Empire
- Died: 2 April 1887 (aged 61); Vienna, Austria-Hungary
- Resting place: Old Jewish Cemetery, Vienna
- Relatives: Helen Adolf (granddaughter); Leonie Adele Spitzer (granddaughter); Hans Nawiasky (grandson)
- Scientific career
- Fields: Differential equations, analytical mechanics, financial mathematics
- Institutions: Vienna Polytechnic Institute; Vienna Handelsschule

Simon Spitzer (3 February 1826 – 2 April 1887) was an Austrian mathematician, whose work largely focused on the integration of differential equations. He was active as a writer in his field and, in addition to several independent works, published a large number of mathematical treatises in scholarly journals.

== Biography ==
Spitzer was born in Vienna into a Jewish family originating from Nikolsburg, Moravia.

He studied mathematics at the University of Vienna, from which he graduated in 1850, and became in 1851 privatdozent at the Vienna Polytechnic Institute. In 1857 he was appointed professor of algebra at the Vienna Handelsschule, which position he held until 1887, at the same time lecturing at the Polytechnic, where he became assistant professor of analytic mechanics in 1863, and professor in 1870. When the Handelsschule was changed into the Handelsakademie Spitzer became its first rector (1872–73). From 1871 he was one of the directors of the private Österreichischen Hypotheken-Bank and a trusted advisor to the world of finance and commerce.

Spitzer was known for his irritable nature, and became involved in scientific disputes—most notably with Joseph Petzval—as the battleground for which he chose political newspapers as opposed to scholarly practice.

His granddaughter was writer Leonie Adele Spitzer.

== Bibliography ==
- Aufsuchung der reellen und imaginären Wurzeln einer Zahlengleichung höheren Grades. Vienna: Wilhelm Braumüller. 1849.
- Allgemeine Auflösung der Zahlen-Gleichungen mit einer oder mehreren Unbekannten. Vienna: Verlag von Carl Gerold. 1851.
- Neue Integrations-Methode für Differenzen-Gleichungen deren Coefficienten ganze algebraische Functionen der unabhängigen Veränderlichen sind. Vienna: K. K. Hof- und Staatsdruckerei. 1858.
- Studien über die Integration linearer Differential-Gleichungen. Vienna: Verlag von Carl Gerold's Sohn. 1860.
- Anleitung zur Berechnung der im Wiener Coursblatte notirten Papiere, nebst einem Anhange über Prämien, Nochgeschäfte und Stellagen. Vienna: Verlag von Carl Gerold's Sohn. 1863.
- Gesammt-Uebersicht über die Production, Consumtion und Circulation der Mineralkohle als Erläuterung zur Kohlenrevier-Karte des Kaiserstaates Oesterreich. Vienna: Prandel & Ewald. 1864.
- "Über Invalidenpensionen". Jahres-Bericht der Wiener Handels-Akademie. Vienna: Druck von J. Löwenthal: 1–57. 1864.
- Tabellen für die Zinses-Zinsen- und Renten-Rechnung: mit Anwendung derselben auf die Berechnung von Anlehen, Construction von Amortisationsplänen etc. Vienna: Verlag von Carl Gerold's Sohn. 1865.
- Anleitung zur Berechnung der Leibrenten und Anwartschaften sowie der Invaliden-Pensionen, Heirathsausstattungen und Krankencassen (2nd ed.). Vienna: Verlag von Carol Gerold's Sohn. 1881.
- Ueber Münz- und Arbitragen-Rechnung (2nd ed.). Vienna: Verlag von Carl Gerold's Sohn. 1872.
- Neue Studien über die Integration linearer Differential-Gleichungen. Vienna: Verlag von Carl Gerold's Sohn. 1874.
- Vorlesungen über lineare Differential-Gleichungen. Vienna: Verlag von Carl Gerold's Sohn. 1878.
- Integration partieller Differentialgleichungen. Vienna: Verlag von Carl Gerold's Sohn. 1879.
- Neue Studien über die Integration linearen Differential-Gleichungen. Vol. 2. Vienna: Verlag von Carl Gerold's Sohn. 1881.
- Untersuchungen im Gebiete linearer Differential-Gleichungen. Vol. 1. Vienna: Verlag von Carl Gerold's Sohn. 1884.
