= Louis Lazarus Silverman =

American mathematician

Louis Lazarus Silverman (21 April 1884 – 17 October 1967) was an American mathematician, the first person to receive a Ph.D. in mathematics from an academic institution in the state of Missouri.

Born in a village in Lithuania, Silverman moved with his parents to the United States when he was eight years old. He received his B.A. and M.A. in mathematics from Harvard University and then his Ph.D. from the University of Missouri in 1910. From 1910 to 1918 he was a faculty member in the department of mathematics at Cornell University, where he worked with Wallie Abraham Hurwitz on divergent series and summability methods. From 1918 to 1953, Silverman was a professor of mathematics at Dartmouth College, where he retired as professor emeritus. He also taught at Tel Aviv University (where he gave lectures in Hebrew), the University of Houston, and South Texas College.

He was an Invited Speaker of the ICM in 1928 in Bologna.

Silverman was an amateur violinist, and his son, Raphael Hillyer Silverman, became a famous viola soloist.

== Selected publications ==
- On the definition of the sum of a divergent series. Vol. 1, no. 1. University of Missouri, 1913.
- "The equivalence of certain regular transformations." Transactions of the American Mathematical Society 26 (1924): 101–112. doi:10.1090/S0002-9947-1924-1501266-4
- with J. D. Tamarkin: "On the generalization of Abel's theorem for certain definitions of summability." Mathematische Zeitschrift 29, no. 1 (1929): 161–170. doi:10.1007/BF01180525
- "Products of Nörlund transformations." Bulletin of the American Mathematical Society 43, no. 2 (1937): 95–101. doi:10.1090/S0002-9904-1937-06501-3
- with Otto Szasz: "On a class of Norlund matrices." Annals of Mathematics (1944): 347–357. doi:10.2307/1969271

== See also ==
- Silverman–Toeplitz theorem
