= Continuant (mathematics) =

Multivariate polynomial

In algebra, the continuant is a multivariate polynomial representing the determinant of a tridiagonal matrix and having applications in continued fractions.

== Definition ==
The n-th continuant $K_n(x_1,\;x_2,\;\ldots,\;x_n)$ is defined recursively by

$$K_0 = 1 ; \,$$
$$K_1(x_1) = x_1 ; \,$$
$$K_n(x_1,\;x_2,\;\ldots,\;x_n) = x_n K_{n-1}(x_1,\;x_2,\;\ldots,\;x_{n-1}) + K_{n-2}(x_1,\;x_2,\;\ldots,\;x_{n-2}) . \,$$

== Properties ==
- The continuant $K_n(x_1,\;x_2,\;\ldots,\;x_n)$ can be computed by taking the sum of all possible products of x_{1},...,x_{n}, in which any number of disjoint pairs of consecutive terms are deleted (Euler's rule). For example,
  $$K_5(x_1,\;x_2,\;x_3,\;x_4,\;x_5) = x_1 x_2 x_3 x_4 x_5\; +\; x_3 x_4 x_5\; +\; x_1 x_4 x_5\; +\; x_1 x_2 x_5\; +\; x_1 x_2 x_3\; +\; x_1\; +\; x_3\; +\; x_5.$$

It follows that continuants are invariant with respect to reversing the order of indeterminates: $K_n(x_1,\;\ldots,\;x_n) = K_n(x_n,\;\ldots,\;x_1).$

- The continuant can be computed as the determinant of a tridiagonal matrix:
  $$K_n(x_1,\;x_2,\;\ldots,\;x_n)=
\det \begin{pmatrix}
x_1 & 1    & 0 &\cdots & 0 \\
-1  & x_2  & 1 &  \ddots    & \vdots\\
0   & -1   & \ddots &\ddots & 0 \\
\vdots & \ddots  & \ddots   &\ddots & 1 \\
0 & \cdots & 0 & -1 &x_n
\end{pmatrix}.$$
- $K_n(1,\;\ldots,\;1) = F_{n+1}$, the (n+1)-st Fibonacci number.
- $\frac{K_n(x_1,\;\ldots,\;x_n)}{K_{n-1}(x_2,\;\ldots,\;x_n)} = x_1 + \frac{K_{n-2}(x_3,\;\ldots,\;x_n)}{K_{n-1}(x_2,\;\ldots,\;x_n)}.$
- Ratios of continuants represent (convergents to) continued fractions as follows:
  $$\frac{K_n(x_1,\;\ldots,x_n)}{K_{n-1}(x_2,\;\ldots,\;x_n)} = [x_1;\;x_2,\;\ldots,\;x_n] = x_1 + \frac{1}{\displaystyle{x_2 + \frac{1}{x_3 + \ldots}}}.$$
- The following matrix identity holds:
  $$\begin{pmatrix} K_n(x_1,\;\ldots,\;x_n) & K_{n-1}(x_1,\;\ldots,\;x_{n-1}) \\ K_{n-1}(x_2,\;\ldots,\;x_n) & K_{n-2}(x_2,\;\ldots,\;x_{n-1}) \end{pmatrix} =
\begin{pmatrix} x_1 & 1 \\ 1 & 0 \end{pmatrix}\times\ldots\times\begin{pmatrix} x_n & 1 \\ 1 & 0 \end{pmatrix}$$.
  - For determinants, it implies that
    $$K_n(x_1,\;\ldots,\;x_n)\cdot K_{n-2}(x_2,\;\ldots,\;x_{n-1}) - K_{n-1}(x_1,\;\ldots,\;x_{n-1})\cdot K_{n-1}(x_2,\;\ldots,\;x_{n}) = (-1)^n.$$
  - and also
    $$K_{n-1}(x_2,\;\ldots,\;x_n)\cdot K_{n+2}(x_1,\;\ldots,\;x_{n+2}) - K_n(x_1,\;\ldots,\;x_n)\cdot K_{n+1}(x_2,\;\ldots,\;x_{n+2}) = (-1)^{n+1} x_{n+2}.$$

== Generalizations ==
A generalized definition takes the continuant with respect to three sequences a, b and c, so that K(n) is a polynomial of a_{1},...,a_{n}, b_{1},...,b_{n−1} and c_{1},...,c_{n−1}. In this case the recurrence relation becomes

$$K_0 = 1 ; \,$$
$$K_1 = a_1 ; \,$$
$$K_n = a_n K_{n-1} - b_{n-1}c_{n-1} K_{n-2} . \,$$

Since b_{r} and c_{r} enter into K only as a product b_{r}c_{r} there is no loss of generality in assuming that the b_{r} are all equal to 1.

The generalized continuant is precisely the determinant of the tridiagonal matrix

$$\begin{pmatrix}
a_1 & b_1 &  0  & \ldots & 0 & 0 \\
c_1 & a_2 & b_2 & \ldots & 0 & 0 \\
0  & c_2 & a_3 & \ldots & 0 & 0 \\
\vdots & \vdots & \vdots & \ddots & \vdots & \vdots \\
0 & 0 & 0 & \ldots & a_{n-1} & b_{n-1} \\
0 & 0 & 0 & \ldots & c_{n-1} & a_n
\end{pmatrix} .$$

In Muir's book the generalized continuant is simply called continuant.
