= Leonie Adele Spitzer =

Austrian writer, poet, and educator (1891–1940)

- Born: 17 May 1891; Vienna, Austria-Hungary
- Died: 5 June 1940 (aged 49); Oxford, United Kingdom
- Relatives: Simon Spitzer (grandfather); Helen Adolf (cousin)
- Writing career
- Language: German

Leonie Adele Spitzer (17 May 1891 – 5 June 1940) was an Austrian writer, poet, and educator.

== Biography ==
Leonie Adele Spitzer was born into a distinguished assimilated Jewish family in Vienna. Her father was Obermedizinalrat Dr. Franz Spitzer, who worked as a physician for the Concordia writers' and journalists' association, while her paternal grandfather was mathematician Simon Spitzer. Her mother Charlotte, née Pokorny, was the daughter of Dr. Wilhelm Pokorny, homeopath and physician to the Austrian aristocracy. She was educated at the Hanausek Lyceum, and passed the teaching qualification examination for French and English in 1912.

Spitzer graduated with a doctorate from the University of Vienna on 21 July 1920, with a dissertation entitled "Über Rilkes Verskunst". She was editor of the Rikola publishing house until 1922, whereupon she pursued teaching as a profession. She passed the teacher's examination for gymnasia in 1923, and then worked at various secondary schools in Vienna, including the Floridsdorf Gymnasium.

She fled to Italy after the annexation of Austria into Nazi Germany in 1938 (her twin brother Dr. Fritz Spitzer, meanwhile, committed suicide). She emigrated to Oxford the following year with the help of Dr. Erna Hollitscher, secretary of the Emergency Sub-Committee for Refugees. She received positions at Cheltenham Ladies' College and then Crofton Grange School, but soon succumbed to a serious illness and died in June 1940.

Because she was Jewish, Spitzer's doctorate was posthumously revoked on 22 July 1943, only to be symbolically re-granted on 15 May 1955.

== Bibliography ==
- Sturmflut. Versdrama.
- Leonore. Novelle.
- Die Familie Höchst. Ein Roman aus der Zeit vor Österreichs Umbruch. Bad Soden am Taunus: Woywod. 1986.
- Adolf, Helen, ed. (1978). Wandlungen der Liebe. Darmstadt: J. G. Bläschke.
