= Cuthill–McKee algorithm =

Numerical linear algebra algorithm

Cuthill-McKee ordering of a matrix

RCM ordering of the same matrix

In numerical linear algebra, the Cuthill–McKee algorithm (CM), named after Elizabeth Cuthill and James McKee, is an algorithm to permute a sparse matrix that has a symmetric sparsity pattern into a band matrix form with a small bandwidth. The reverse Cuthill–McKee algorithm (RCM) due to Alan George and Joseph Liu is the same algorithm but with the resulting index numbers reversed. In practice this generally results in less fill-in than the CM ordering when Gaussian elimination is applied.

The Cuthill McKee algorithm is a variant of the standard breadth-first search algorithm used in graph algorithms. It starts with a peripheral node and then generates levels $R_i$ for $i=1, 2,..$ until all nodes are exhausted. The set $R_{i+1}$ is created from set $R_i$ by listing all vertices adjacent to all nodes in $R_i$. These nodes are ordered according to predecessors and degree.

== Algorithm ==
Given a symmetric $n\times n$ matrix we visualize the matrix as the adjacency matrix of a graph. The Cuthill–McKee algorithm is then a relabeling of the vertices of the graph to reduce the bandwidth of the adjacency matrix.

The algorithm produces an ordered n-tuple $R$ of vertices which is the new order of the vertices.

First we choose a peripheral vertex (the vertex with the lowest degree) $x$ and set $R := ( \{ x \})$.

Then for $i = 1,2,\dots$ we iterate the following steps while $|R| < n$

- Construct the adjacency set $A_i$ of $R_i$ (with $R_i$ the i-th component of $R$) and exclude the vertices we already have in $R$

$$A_i := \operatorname{Adj}(R_i) \setminus R$$

- Sort $A_i$ ascending by minimum predecessor (the already-visited neighbor with the earliest position in R), and as a tiebreak ascending by vertex degree.
- Append $A_i$ to the Result set $R$.

In other words, number the vertices according to a particular level structure (computed by breadth-first search) where the vertices in each level are visited in order of their predecessor's numbering from lowest to highest. Where the predecessors are the same, vertices are distinguished by degree (again ordered from lowest to highest).

== See also ==
- Graph bandwidth
- Sparse matrix
