= Helen Adolf =

Austrian-American linguist and literature scholar

- Born: Helene Adolf; December 31, 1895; Vienna, Austria-Hungary
- Died: December 13, 1998 (aged 102); State College, Pennsylvania, U.S.
- Occupations: Poet, linguist, writer

Helen Adolf (December 31, 1895 – December 13, 1998) was an Austrian–American linguist and literature scholar.

== Early life and education ==
Helene "Elly" Adolf was born in 1895 in Vienna, Austria-Hungary. Her family was Jewish. Her mother, Hedwig (née Spitzer) Adolf, was an artist, while her father, Jakob Adolf, was a lawyer. Adolf had one older sister, Anna Simona Adolf (Mrs. Spiegel; 1893–1983), who became a medical doctor. Helen and Anna Adolf were first cousins of writer Leonie Adele Spitzer.

She received her medical degree from the University of Vienna and eventually moved to the United States to work in medical education. Adolf attended the University of Vienna and graduated in 1923 with her PhD in literature. Unable to find work in Vienna, she moved to Leipzig, Germany to seek work.

== Career in Europe ==
Upon moving to Leipzig, she worked for Reclam. At Reclam, she worked on creating publications focused around the history of the German Confederation through the beginning of World War I in Germany. Outside of working at Reclam, Adolf also wrote poetry and studied subjects like religion and psychology. She also translated literature, including Sainte Thérèse d'Avila by Jeanne Galzy. She served as secretary at the International Society for the Psychology of Religion from 1923 until 1938.

== Relocation and work in the United States ==
Due to the Anschluss, Adolf decided to leave Europe. She went to the United States in April 1939. She went to Philadelphia, Pennsylvania, where her sister lived. She received assistance from the American Friends Service Committee. She attended the University of Pennsylvania to study Spanish. She worked in Virginia and Colorado at secondary schools teaching languages. She moved back to Philadelphia in 1943. She started working at Pennsylvania State University that year.

In 1946, she started working at the University Park campus. In 1953, she became full professor there. She was the schools' first Liberal Arts Research Scholar, which she was named in 1958.

She wrote in German, writing poetry. She studied The Holy Grail extensively and published the book Visio Pacis: Holy City and Grail in 1961. The book was awarded the Louis H. Memorial Award. Her work was published in Austria in 1964.

A Festschrift was published about her in 1968. She was awarded the Cross of Honour for Science and Art, First Class, in 1987. She retired in 1979.

== Death ==
Helen Adolf died on December 13, 1998, aged 102, in State College, Pennsylvania.

== Selected works by Helen Adolf ==
- "F. Hallali, Germ. Halali = "Praise (My Soul)"?" Studies in Philology. Vol. 46, No. 4 (Oct. 1949), pp. 514–520.
- "New Light on Oriental Sources for Wolfram's Parzival and Other Grail Romances." PMLA. Vol. 62, No. 2 (Jun. 1947), pp. 306–324.
- "Schlußwort." The German Quarterly, Vol. 34, No. 3 (May 1961), p. 237.
- "Studies in the Perlesvaus; The Historical Background." Studies in Philology. Vol. 42, No. 4 (Oct. 1945), pp. 723–740.
- "The Essence and Origin of Tragedy." The Journal of Aesthetics and Art Criticism. Vol. 10, No. 2 (Dec. 1951), pp. 112–125.
