= David Spicer =

David Spicer may refer to:

- Dave Spicer (born 1985), Canadian rugby player
- David Spicer (organist) (1946–2017), church musician and co-founder of Albert Schweitzer Organ Festival USA
- David Spicer (writer), writer of the BBC Radio series Double Income, No Kids Yet
- David Spicer, Australian journalist, profiler of Ivanhoe, New South Wales
- David Alan Spicer, creator of Sparcade, an Arcade emulator
- David Spicer, artist, featured in Goldwell Open Air Museum
