= Monroe D. Donsker =

American mathematician (1924–1991)

Monroe David Donsker
- Born: October 17, 1924; Burlington, Iowa, USA
- Died: June 8, 1991 (aged 66); New York City, USA
- Education: University of Minnesota
- Known for: Donsker’s theorem Donsker–Varadhan variational formula
- Scientific career
- Workplaces: Cornell University; University of Minnesota; New York University
- Doctoral advisor: Robert Horton Cameron
- Doctoral students: Glen E. Baxter

Monroe David Donsker (October 17, 1924 – June 8, 1991) was an American mathematician and a professor of mathematics at New York University (NYU). His research interest was probability theory.

== Education and career ==
Donsker was born in Burlington, Iowa. He received a Ph.D. in mathematics at the University of Minnesota in 1948 under the supervision of Robert Horton Cameron. He became a professor at NYU's Courant Institute of Mathematical Sciences in 1962, about a year before his frequent co-author S.R.S. Varadhan started working there. Before joining NYU, Donsker taught at Cornell University and the University of Minnesota. His doctoral students include Glen E. Baxter.

Donsker also served as chair of the Fulbright Foreign Scholarship Board, a U.S. government panel responsible for student exchange programs, after being appointed by presidents Ford and Carter.

In probability theory, Donsker is known for his proof of the Donsker invariance principle which shows the convergence in distribution of a rescaled random walk to the Wiener process.

== Personal life ==
Donsker was married to Mary Davis (1923 – 2013), who was a watercolor artist with a degree in economics from University of Minnesota.

== See also ==
- Donsker classes
