= Spitzer's formula =

In probability theory, Spitzer's formula or Spitzer's identity gives the joint distribution of partial sums and maximal partial sums of a collection of random variables. The result was first published by Frank Spitzer in 1956. The formula is regarded as "a stepping stone in the theory of sums of independent random variables".

== Statement of theorem ==
Let $X_1,X_2,...$ be independent and identically distributed random variables and define the partial sums $S_n=X_1 + X_2 + ... + X_n$. Define $R_n=\text{max}(0,S_1,S_2,...S_n)$. Then

$$\sum_{n=0}^\infty \phi_n(\alpha,\beta)t^n = \exp \left[ \sum_{n=1}^\infty \frac{t^n}{n} \left( u_n (\alpha) + v_n(\beta) -1 \right) \right]$$

where

$$\begin{align}
\phi_n(\alpha,\beta) &= \operatorname E(\exp\left[ i(\alpha R_n + \beta(R_n-S_n)\right])\\
u_n(\alpha) &= \operatorname E(\exp \left[i\alpha S_n^+\right]) \\
v_n(\beta) &= \operatorname E(\exp \left[i \beta S_n^-\right])
\end{align}$$

and S^{±} denotes (|S| ± S)/2.

=== Proofs ===
The formula was first proved by Spitzer. A short proof was later given by Wendel. The formula can be understood in terms of a Rota-Baxter algebra.
