= Spitzer Cross =

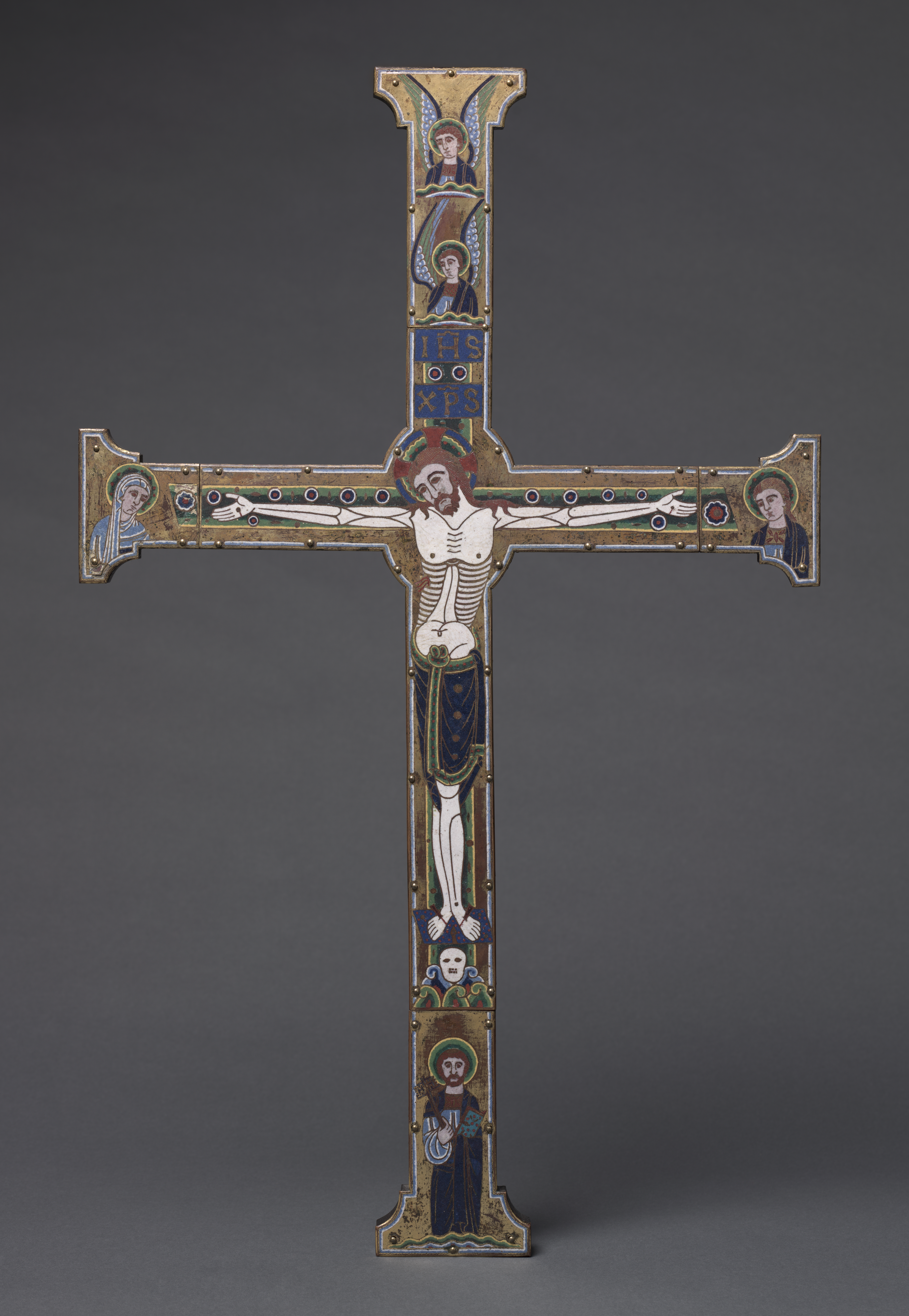
- Artist: Master of the Royal Plantagenet Workshop
- Year: 12th century
- Location: Cleveland Museum of Art

The Spitzer Cross (c. 1190) is a gilded champlevé enameled Crucifix, made in Limoges, France, by an unknown artisan whom scholars have named the "Master of the Royal Plantagenet Workshop" and "Master of the Grandmont Altar." This meticulously crafted piece is considered one of the finest surviving examples of Limoges enamel from the Medieval period. Once part of the famous Spitzer Collection for whom it is named, it is now in the permanent collection of the Cleveland Museum of Art.

== History ==
The southwestern city of Limoges was known for its superior metalwork and jewel-colored enamels for both religious and secular purposes. Often referred to as Opus lemoviense (Limoges work), these enameled pieces were highly prized and commissioned internationally, resulting in their wide spread across Medieval Europe. The use of fine lines and careful detail allow scholars to connect the Spitzer Cross to the Abbey of Grandmont outside Limoges, where it was used as processional cross. The Abbey of Grandmont attracted the patronage of King Henry II of England (1154-1189) who donated large sums of money during his life and upon his death for expensive adornments including reliquaries and liturgical objects such as the Spitzer Cross.

The cross once held ten plaques; five on its face and five on the reverse side. The reverse pieces, now housed in private or museum collections, depicted symbols of the four evangelists, one each at the ends of the cross arms with a mandorla-encircled Christ at its center. Early illustrations of the Spitzer Cross present a replacement piece; one of Christ's arms did not match the rest of the original plaques, which suggests that at one point it became separated from the cross. Remarkably, Baron Frédéric Spitzer, one of the previous owners of the cross, relocated the original piece and restored it to its original form; the coloring, enameling, and edging is identical, as catalogue photographs show.

Also leading to the circulation of enameled pieces was Christian Pilgrimage. Limoges was a prominent stopping point for pilgrims making the journey from the shrines in France to the Holy Tomb of the biblical apostle Saint James at Santiago de Compostela in Spain because of its high percentage of shrines devoted to Saints. Along this route, treasured items were often scattered as gifts. Called the Camino de Santiago today, the pilgrimage remains a popular spiritual endeavor for Christians worldwide.

== Provenance ==
The cross was owned by Belgian Lieutenant-General B. Meyers, and then acquired by Viennese art collector and dealer Baron Frédéric Spitzer, for whom it is named. Frédéric Spitzer (1815-1890) accumulated wealth after purchasing and selling an Albrecht Dürer engraving. With the substantial profit, he began to build his famed collection. In 1852, Spitzer established himself in Paris as one of the foremost art buyers and sellers with a distinct emphasis on Medieval and Renaissance art.

In 1893, the Spitzer Collection was put up for public auction over a period of three months and took place at Chevallier & Mannheim, Paris. Prior to the sale, various American newspapers published editorials urging institutions or private donors to collaborate and purchase the entire collection for a public museum, such as the Metropolitan Museum of Art. Despite these pleas, the majority of the collection was purchased by George Salting (1835-1909), a private collector from Australia who resided in London. After his death, Salting bequeathed his collection to the British Museum, the National Gallery in London, and the Victoria and Albert Museum. Other pieces from the Spitzer Collection now enhance collections at institutions such as the Louvre ("Reliquary in the form of a portable altar in Hildesheim enamels: “Vinea mea” cross and twelve apostles" in 1913), and the Musée de Cluny (Christ in Majesty binding plate, in 1893).

The Spitzer Cross was donated to Cleveland Museum of Art in 1923, by American industrialist Jeptha Wade.

== Description ==
The Cross is made from gilded and engraved copper inlaid with champlevé enamel. It consists of five individual plaques which are affixed to a wooden center. It boasts a stunning array of colors, including dark blue, light blue, white, green, yellow, and red, with intricate details such as the texture of Christ's hair, clothing, halos, and angel wings, with repetitive patterns that have been meticulously crafted by a skilled hand.

The Cross is adorned with intricate details and vibrant colors, with the crucifixion of Christ as its central focus. Christ is depicted in the middle with a rosy-white complexion, wearing a knee-length loincloth of deep blue with green and yellow detailing, and a halo adorned with rosettes. Two stylized angel busts emerge from the skies above his head, while Virgin Mary is on his right, tilting her head towards him, and St. John is on his left. There is blood flowing from Christ's pierced right rib/side, with his waist appearing thin, his belly slightly distended, and his outstretched arms displaying thin symmetrical lines of muscle. The ribs of Christ are anatomically accurate, showing twelve pairs. The foot support, known as a suppedaneum, is depicted in rich blue with red specks, and the skull of Adam can be seen below. At the bottom of the Cross, St. Peter can be identified by the keys he is holding.

The dimensions of the cross are 67.4 x 41.9 cm, the largest recorded of this type and it contains two inscriptions: the Christogram "IHS" [IHSVS] (Jesus); "XPS" [XPISTVS] (Christus).

== Symbolism ==
In the Gospel of John (19:26) Jesus entrusts his mother with the care of his beloved disciple John, and so, John to her. The placement of the Virgin Mary and Saint John the Evangelist at the left and right Christ reflects this biblical passage.

The skull of Adam at Christ's feet represents the belief that the crucifixion happened where Adam was buried. Medieval lore suggests the wooden cross on which Christ was crucified is from a tree that grew from a seed of the Tree of the Knowledge of Good and Evil, the tree from which the forbidden fruit came and the original sin occurred. The seed was planted in—and grew from—the grave of Adam. The crucifixion happened at this same site. Thus, the blood Christ shed washed into the grave as a sign of redemption for the fall of man. It can also symbolize Jesus' victory over sin and death.

Peter holding the keys is a Biblical reference. According to The Gospel of Matthew (16:18-19) Christ said to Peter: “And I tell you that you are Peter, and on this rock I will build my church... I will give you the keys to the kingdom of heaven.” The pair of gold and silver keys became Saint Peter's attribute.

Blue was symbolic of multiple meanings, the most important being Heaven. While artists of illuminated manuscripts used expensive lapis lazuli to achieve bold blues, enamellers could achieve bright colors by mixing cobalt with flinty substances such as sand potash.

== Technique ==
Limoges artisans were goldsmiths, in that they used a variety of metals including gold, silver, and copper, as in the Spitzer Cross. Metal is engraved, channeled, or carved leaving stippled ridges to be filled. Next, it is filled with a mix of powdered glass and metallic oxides, and fired until the enamel fuses. The final step in the process of creating champlevé decorative arts is to polish to a high shine.

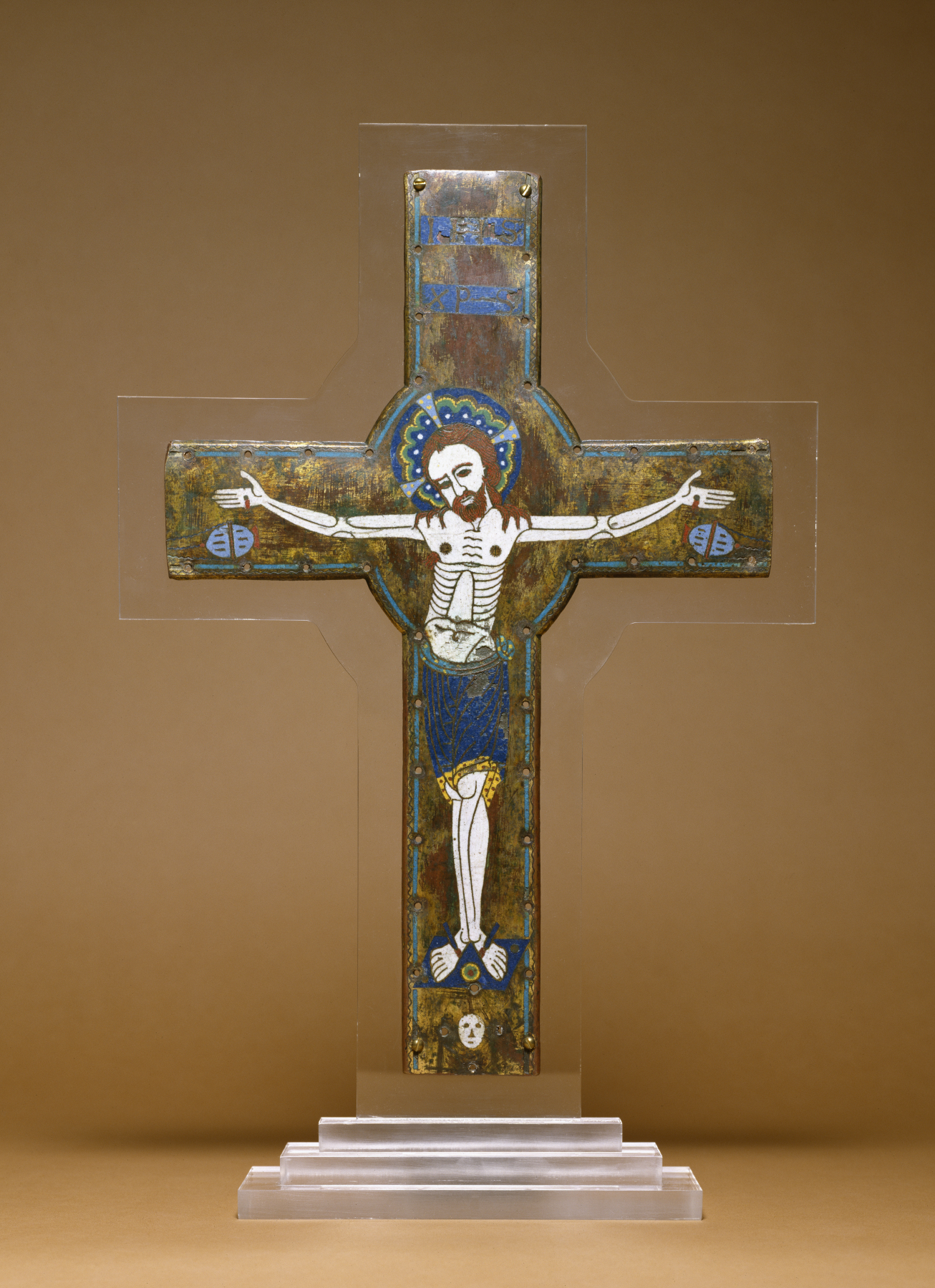
Similar crucifix, also sold from the Spitzer collection, now in the Walters Art Museum

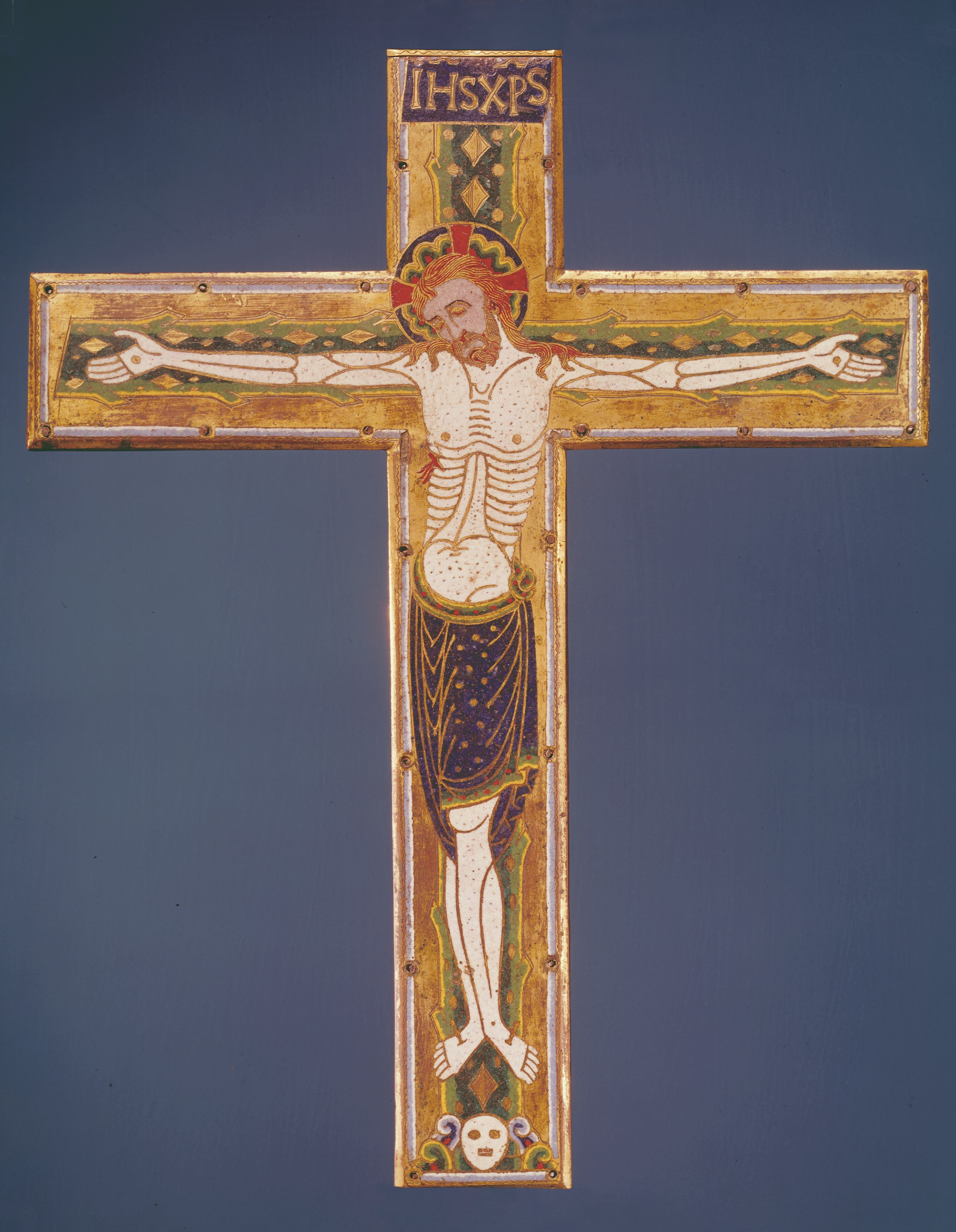
Similar crucifix, Metropolitan Museum of Art

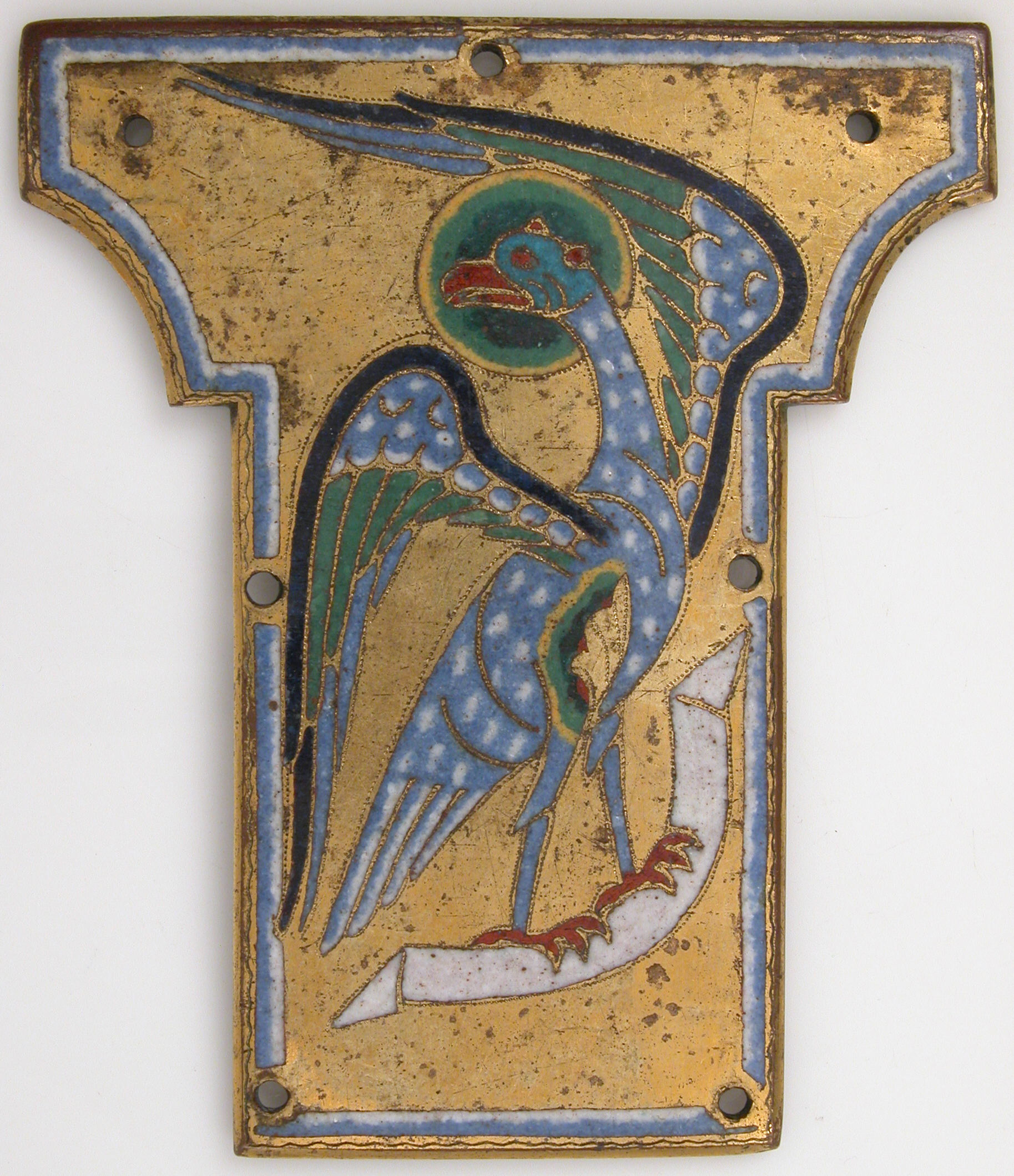
Plaque with the eagle of Saint John, Metropolitan Museum of Art
