= John Spicer =

John Spicer may refer to:

== Politicians ==
- John Spicer (Australian politician) (1899–1978)
- John Spicer (died 1623), MP for Dorchester
- John Spicer (fl. 1421), MP for Derby
- John Spicer (died 1423/4), MP for Bishop's Lynn
- John Spicer (died c.1428), MP for Oxford

== Others ==
- John Spicer (footballer) (born 1983), English footballer
- John Spicer/Spencer (martyr), burnt 1556, in the Marian persecutions

== See also ==
- Jack Spicer (disambiguation)
