= Baxter permutation =

In combinatorial mathematics, a Baxter permutation is a permutation $\sigma \in S_n$ which satisfies the following generalized pattern avoidance property:

- There are no indices $i<j<k$ such that $\sigma(j+1)<\sigma(i)<\sigma(k)<\sigma(j)$ or $\sigma(j)<\sigma(k)<\sigma(i)<\sigma(j+1)$.

Equivalently, using the notation for vincular patterns, a Baxter permutation is one that avoids the two dashed patterns $2-41-3$ and $3-14-2$.

For example, the permutation $\sigma=2413$ in $S_4$ (written in one-line notation) is not a Baxter permutation because, taking $i= 1$, $j=2$ and $k = 4$, this permutation violates the first condition.

These permutations were introduced by Glen E. Baxter in the context of mathematical analysis.

== Enumeration ==
For $n = 1, 2, 3, \ldots$, the number $a_n$ of Baxter permutations of length $n$ is

1, 2, 6, 22, 92, 422, 2074, 10754, 58202, 326240, 1882960, 11140560, 67329992, 414499438, 2593341586, 16458756586, ... (sequence A001181 in the OEIS)

In general, $a_n$ has the following formula:
$$a_n \, = \,\sum_{k=1}^n \frac{\binom{n+1}{k-1}\binom{n+1}{k}\binom{n+1}{k+1}}{\binom{n+1}{1}\binom{n+1}{2}}
.$$
In fact, this formula is graded by the number of descents in the permutations, i.e., there are $\frac{\binom{n+1}{k-1}\binom{n+1}{k}\binom{n+1}{k+1}}{\binom{n+1}{1}\binom{n+1}{2}}$ Baxter permutations in $S_n$ with $k-1$ descents.

== Other properties ==
- The number of alternating Baxter permutations of length $2n$ is $(C_n)^2$, the square of a Catalan number, and of length $2n+1$ is

$C_n C_{n+1}$.

- The number of doubly alternating Baxter permutations of length $2n$ and $2n+1$ (i.e., those for which both $\sigma$ and its inverse $\sigma^{-1}$ are alternating) is the Catalan number $C_n$.
- Baxter permutations are related to Hopf algebras, planar graphs, tilings, and rectangulations.

== Motivation: commuting functions ==
Baxter introduced Baxter permutations while studying the fixed points of commuting continuous functions. In particular, if $f$ and $g$ are continuous functions from the interval $[0, 1]$ to itself such that $f(g(x)) = g(f(x))$ for all $x$, and $f(g(x)) = x$ for finitely many $x$ in $[0, 1]$, then:

- the number of these fixed points is odd;
- if the fixed points are $x_1 < x_2< \ldots < x_{2k + 1}$ then $f$ and $g$ act as mutually-inverse permutations on

$\{x_1,x_3, \ldots, x_{2k + 1} \}$ and $\{x_2, x_4,\ldots, x_{2k} \}$;

- the permutation induced by $f$ on $\{x_1, x_3, \ldots, x_{2k+1}\}$ uniquely determines the permutation induced by

$f$ on $\{ x_2, x_4, \ldots, x_{2k}\}$;

- under the natural relabeling $x_1\to 1$, $x_3\to 2$, etc., the permutation induced on $\{1, 2, \ldots, k + 1\}$ is a Baxter permutation.

== See also ==
- Enumerations of specific permutation classes
