= Glen E. Baxter =

American mathematician (1930-1983)

- Born: March 19, 1930; Minneapolis, Minnesota, U.S.
- Died: March 30, 1983 (aged 53)
- Education: University of Minnesota
- Known for: Baxter permutation Rota–Baxter algebra
- Spouse: Reberta Baxter
- Scientific career
- Fields: Mathematics
- Workplaces: University of California at San Diego; University of Aarhus; Purdue University
- Doctoral advisor: Monroe D. Donsker

Glen Earl Baxter (March 19, 1930 – March 30, 1983) was an American mathematician.

Baxter's fields of research include probability theory, combinatorial analysis, statistical mechanics and functional analysis. He is known for the Baxter strong limit theorem. Lately, his 1960 work on the derivation of a specific operator identity that later bore his name, the Rota–Baxter identity, and emanated from some of the fundamental results of the famous probabilist Frank Spitzer in random walk theory has received attention in fields as remote as renormalization theory in perturbative quantum field theory.

In 1983 the Glen E. Baxter Memorial Fund was established by family and friends at Purdue University.
