= Jack Spicer (disambiguation) =

Jack Spicer may refer to:

- Jack Spicer, American poet
- Jack Spicer (Xiaolin Showdown), a character from the animated television show Xiaolin Showdown

== See also ==
- John Spicer (disambiguation)
