= Irregular matrix =

Matrix with a different number of elements in each row

An irregular matrix, or ragged matrix, is a matrix that has a different number of elements in each row. Ragged matrices are not used in linear algebra, since standard matrix transformations cannot be performed on them, but they are useful in computing as arrays which are called jagged arrays. Irregular matrices are typically stored using Iliffe vectors.

For example, the following is an irregular matrix:

$$\begin{bmatrix}
1 & 31 & 12& -3 \\
7 & 2 \\
1 & 2 & 2
\end{bmatrix}$$

== See also ==
- Regular matrix (disambiguation)
- Empty matrix
- Sparse matrix
