= Michael Cuthill =

Australian environmentalist

Michael Cuthill is an Australian environmentalist known for his contributions to community engagement and environmental management. He served as the Director of the Community Engagement Centre of the University of Queensland, Ipswich (Note: Sold to the University of Southern Queensland in 2014 - Trounson, Andrew (21 July 2014). "USQ to make a go of UQ underused Ipswich campus". The Australian.) Campus.

Previously, Michael Cuthill has had a diverse career in environmental and community-focused roles. Prior to his directorship at the University of Queensland, he served as a lecturer at the School of Environmental and Recreation Management at the University of South Australia. Cuthill also worked as a Research Officer at the Great Barrier Reef Cooperative Research Centre, which is affiliated with James Cook University, and held the position of Technical Services Manager at the Australian Institute of Marine Science.

== Selected bibliography ==
Book Chapters

- Cuthill, M. 2004, Citizen Participation, Local Governance, and Sustainable Communities in Richards, C. and Aitken, L. (eds) 2004, Social Innovations in Natural Resource Management pp. 20–22.

Journal Articles

- Cuthill, M. & Fien, J. 2005, Building community capacity through citizen participation in local governance Australian Journal of Public Administration, 64(4): 63–80.
- Cuthill, M. & Warburton, J. 2005, A conceptual framework for volunteer management in local government Urban Policy and Research, 23(1): 113–126.
- Lloyd, K. Harrington, M. Hibbins, R. Boag, A. & Cuthill, M. 2005, Is it fun to be young on the Gold Coast? Perceptions of leisure opportunities and constraints among young people on the Gold Coast Youth Studies Australia 24:1, pp. 22–27.
- Cuthill, M. 2004, Community visioning: Facilitating informed citizen participation in local area planning on the Gold Coast Urban Policy and Research, 22(4): 427–445.
- Cuthill, M. 2004, Community well-being: The ultimate goal of democratic governance Queensland Planner, 44(2): 8–11.
- Cuthill, M. 2003, The contribution of human and social capital to building community well-being: A research agenda relating to citizen participation in local governance in Australia Urban Policy and Research, 21(4): 373–391.
- Cuthill, M. 2003, From here to utopia: Running a human scale development workshop on the Gold Coast Local Environment, 8(4): 471–485.
- Cuthill, M. 2002, Coolangatta: A portrait of community well-being Urban Policy and Research, 20(2): 187–203.
- Cuthill, M. 2002, Exploratory research: Citizen participation, local governance and sustainable development in Australia Journal of Sustainable Development, 10(2): 79–89.
- Cuthill, M. 2001, Developing local government policy and processes for community consultation and participation Urban Policy and Research, 19(2): 183–202.

Other

- Cuthill, M. 2002, Opportunities for empowerment: Citizen participation, local governance, and collaborative local action for sustainable community, PhD Thesis, School of Australian Environmental Sciences, Griffith University.
