= Matrix Market exchange formats =

The Matrix Market exchange formats are a set of human readable, ASCII-based file formats designed to facilitate the exchange of matrix data. The file formats were designed and adopted for the Matrix Market, a NIST repository for test data for use in comparative studies of algorithms for numerical linear algebra.

== See also ==
- Harwell-Boeing file format
