= Frank Spitzer =

Austrian-born American mathematician

Frank L. Spitzer
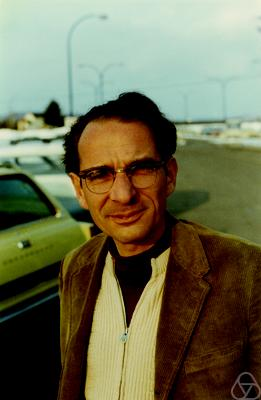
- Frank Spitzer
- Born: Franz Ludwig Spitzer; July 24, 1926; Vienna, Austria
- Died: February 1, 1992 (aged 65); Ithaca, New York
- Citizenship: Austrian, American
- Education: University of Michigan (Ph.D., B.A.)
- Known for: Asymmetric simple exclusion process Wiener sausage Spitzer's formula
- Awards: ICM Speaker (1974)
- Scientific career
- Fields: Mathematics
- Workplaces: Cornell University
- Thesis: On The Theory Of The Stochastic Processes Which Appear In The Descriptionof Two Dimensional Brownian Motion By Polar Coordinates (1953)
- Doctoral advisor: Donald Allan Darling

Frank Ludvig Spitzer (July 24, 1926 – February 1, 1992) was an Austrian-born, Jewish-American mathematician who was a longtime professor at Cornell University and made fundamental contributions to probability theory, especially the theory of random walks, Brownian motion, and fluctuation theory, and then the theory of interacting particle systems. Other areas he made contributions to include percolation theory and the Wiener sausage. He focussed broadly on "phenomena", rather than any one of the many specific theorems that might help to articulate a given phenomenon. His book Principles of Random Walk, first published in 1964, remains a well-cited classic.

Spitzer was born on July 24, 1926, in Vienna, into an Austrian Jewish family. By the time he was twelve years old, the Nazi threat in Austria was evident. His parents were able to send him to a summer camp for Jewish children in Sweden, and, as a result, Spitzer spent all of the World War II years in Sweden. He lived with two Swedish families, learned Swedish, graduated from high school, and for one year attended Tekniska Hogskolan in Stockholm.

During the war years, Spitzer's parents and his sister were able to make their way to the United States by passing through the unoccupied parts of France and North Africa, and, after the war, Spitzer joined his family in their new country. Spitzer enlisted in the U.S. Army just as the war in Europe was ending. After completing his military service in 1947, Spitzer entered the University of Michigan to study mathematics. He completed his B.A. and Ph.D. there in just six years, receiving his doctorate in 1953.

Spitzer's first academic appointments were at the California Institute of Technology (1953–1955) and the University of Minnesota (1955–1960), but most of his academic career was spent at Cornell University, where he started as a full professor in 1961. He did take part in leaves at Princeton University in the U.S. and the Mittag-Leffler Institute in Sweden. Among his honors, Spitzer was a member of the National Academy of Sciences.

A multi-year struggle with Parkinson's disease culminated Spitzer's retirement from Cornell in 1991, at which point he became a professor emeritus. He died on February 1, 1992 at Tomkins County Hospital in Ithaca, New York.

== Selected publications ==
- Spitzer, Frank (1976), Principles of Random Walk, Graduate Texts in Mathematics, vol. 34, New York-Heidelberg: Springer-Verlag, p. 40, MR 0171290
