= Timeline of numerical analysis after 1945 =

The following is a timeline of numerical analysis after 1945, and deals with developments after the invention of the modern electronic computer, which began during Second World War. For a fuller history of the subject before this period, see timeline and history of mathematics.

== 1940s ==
- Monte Carlo simulation (voted one of the top 10 algorithms of the 20th century) invented at Los Alamos by von Neumann, Ulam and Metropolis.
- Crank–Nicolson method was developed by Crank and Nicolson.
- Dantzig introduces the simplex method (voted one of the top 10 algorithms of the 20th century) in 1947.
- Turing formulated the LU decomposition method.

== 1950s ==
- Successive over-relaxation was devised simultaneously by D.M. Young Jr. and by H. Frankel in 1950.
- Hestenes, Stiefel, and Lanczos, all from the Institute for Numerical Analysis at the National Bureau of Standards, initiate the development of Krylov subspace iteration methods. Voted one of the top 10 algorithms of the 20th century.
- Equations of State Calculations by Fast Computing Machines introduces the Metropolis–Hastings algorithm.
- In numerical differential equations, Lax and Friedrichs invent the Lax-Friedrichs method.
- Householder invents his eponymous matrices and transformation method (voted one of the top 10 algorithms of the 20th century).
- Romberg integration
- John G.F. Francis and Vera Kublanovskaya invent QR factorization (voted one of the top 10 algorithms of the 20th century).

== 1960s ==
- First recorded use of the term "finite element method" by Ray Clough, to describe the methods of Courant, Hrenikoff, Galerkin and Zienkiewicz, among others. See also here.
- Exponential integration by Certaine and Pope.
- In computational fluid dynamics and numerical differential equations, Lax and Wendroff invent the Lax-Wendroff method.
- Fast Fourier Transform (voted one of the top 10 algorithms of the 20th century) invented by Cooley and Tukey.
- First edition of Handbook of Mathematical Functions by Abramowitz and Stegun, both of the U.S.National Bureau of Standards.
- Broyden does new quasi-Newton method for finding roots in 1965.
- The MacCormack method, for the numerical solution of hyperbolic partial differential equations in computational fluid dynamics, is introduced by MacCormack in 1969.
- Verlet (re)discovers a numerical integration algorithm, (first used in 1791 by Delambre, by Cowell and Crommelin in 1909, and by Carl Fredrik Störmer in 1907, hence the alternative names Störmer's method or the Verlet-Störmer method) for dynamics.

== 1970s ==
Creation of LINPACK and associated benchmark by Dongarra et al., as well as BLAS.

== 1980s ==
- Progress in wavelet theory throughout the decade, led by Daubechies et al.
- Creation of MINPACK.
- Fast multipole method (voted one of the top 10 algorithms of the 20th century) invented by Rokhlin and Greengard.
- First edition of Numerical Recipes by Press, Teukolsky, et al.
- In numerical linear algebra, the GMRES algorithm invented in 1986.

== See also ==
- Scientific computing
- History of numerical solution of differential equations using computers
- Numerical analysis
- Timeline of computational mathematics
