= Timeline of computational mathematics =

This is a timeline of key developments in computational mathematics.

== 18th century ==
- Anton Felkel and Carl Hindenburg (independently of Felkel) build and use mechanical prime sieves based on the stencil method

== 1890s ==
- F. W. Lawrence provides a high-level design for a mechanical, automated prime sieve in his paper "Factorisation of numbers".

== 1910s ==
- Lawrence's "Factorisation of numbers" is republished in French, sparking efforts to build a mechanical prime sieve. Eugène-Olivier Carissan builds his machine à congruences, a working mechanical sieve, in 1919.

== 1920s ==
- D. H. Lehmer builds an electromechanical number sieve, the "bicycle" Lehmer sieve, in 1926

== 1930s ==
- D. H. Lehmer builds further Lehmer sieves: the "gear sieve" in 1932 and the "film strip sieve" in 1936

== 1940s ==
- Monte Carlo simulation (voted one of the top 10 algorithms of the 20th century) invented at Los Alamos by von Neumann, Ulam and Metropolis.
- Dantzig introduces the simplex algorithm (voted one of the top 10 algorithms of the 20th century).
- First hydro simulations at Los Alamos occurred.
- Ulam and von Neumann introduce the notion of cellular automata.
- A routine for the Manchester Baby written to factor a large number (2^18), one of the first in computational number theory. The Manchester group would make several other breakthroughs in this area.
- LU decomposition technique first discovered.

== 1950s ==
- Hestenes, Stiefel, and Lanczos, all from the Institute for Numerical Analysis at the National Bureau of Standards, initiate the development of Krylov subspace iteration methods. Voted one of the top 10 algorithms of the 20th century.
- Equations of State Calculations by Fast Computing Machines introduces the Metropolis–Hastings algorithm. Also, important earlier independent work by Alder and S. Frankel.
- Enrico Fermi, Stanislaw Ulam, John Pasta, and Mary Tsingou, discover the Fermi–Pasta–Ulam–Tsingou problem.
- In network theory, Ford & Fulkerson compute a solution to the maximum flow problem.
- Householder invents his eponymous matrices and transformation method (voted one of the top 10 algorithms of the 20th century).
- Molecular dynamics invented by Alder and Wainwright
- John G.F. Francis and Vera Kublanovskaya invent QR factorization (voted one of the top 10 algorithms of the 20th century).

== 1960s ==
- First recorded use of the term "finite element method" by Ray Clough, to describe the methods of Courant, Hrenikoff and Zienkiewicz, among others. See also here.
- Using computational investigations of the 3-body problem, Minovitch formulates the gravity assist method.
- Molecular dynamics was invented independently by Aneesur Rahman.
- Cooley and Tukey re-invent the Fast Fourier transform (voted one of the top 10 algorithms of the 20th century), an algorithm first discovered by Gauss.
- Edward Lorenz discovers the butterfly effect on a computer, attracting interest in chaos theory.
- Kruskal and Zabusky follow up the Fermi–Pasta–Ulam–Tsingou problem with further numerical experiments, and coin the term "soliton".
- Birch and Swinnerton-Dyer conjecture formulated through investigations on a computer.
- Grobner bases and Buchberger's algorithm invented for algebra
- Frenchman Verlet (re)discovers a numerical integration algorithm, (first used in 1791 by Delambre, by Cowell and Crommelin in 1909, and by Carl Fredrik Störmer in 1907, hence the alternative names Störmer's method or the Verlet-Störmer method) for dynamics.
- Risch invents algorithm for symbolic integration.

== 1970s ==
- Mandelbrot, from studies of the Fatou, Julia and Mandelbrot sets, coined and popularized the term 'fractal' to describe these structures' self-similarity.
- Kenneth Appel and Wolfgang Haken prove the four colour theorem, the first theorem to be proved by computer.

== 1980s ==
- Fast multipole method invented by Rokhlin and Greengard (voted one of the top 10 algorithms of the 20th century).

== 1990s ==
- The appearance of the first research grids using volunteer computing – GIMPS (1996) and distributed.net (1997).
- Kepler conjecture is almost all but certainly proved algorithmically by Thomas Hales in 1998.

== 2000s ==
- In computational group theory, God's Number for the Rubik's Cube is shown to be 20.
- Mathematicians completely map the E8-group.

== 2010s ==
- Hales completes the proof of Kepler's conjecture.

== See also ==
- Timeline of scientific computing
- Computational mathematics
- Timeline of algorithms
- Timeline of mathematics from the 20th century onwards
- Timeline of numerical analysis after 1945
