= Computational science =

Specialist field of computer science

Computational science, also known as scientific computing, technical computing or scientific computation (SC), is a division of science, and more specifically the computer sciences, which uses advanced computing capabilities to understand and solve complex physical problems in science. While this typically extends into computational specializations, this field of study includes:

- Algorithms (numerical and non-numerical): mathematical models, computational models, and computer simulations developed to solve sciences (e.g, physical, biological, and social), engineering, and humanities problems
- Computer hardware that develops and optimizes the advanced system hardware, firmware, networking, and data management components needed to solve computationally demanding problems
- The computing infrastructure that supports both the science and engineering problem solving and the developmental computer and information science

In practical use, it is typically the application of computer simulation and other forms of computation from numerical analysis and theoretical computer science to solve problems in various scientific disciplines. The field is different from theory and laboratory experiments, which are the traditional forms of science and engineering. The scientific computing approach is to gain understanding through the analysis of mathematical models implemented on computers. Scientists and engineers develop computer programs and application software that model systems being studied and run these programs with various sets of input parameters. The essence of computational science is the application of numerical algorithms and computational mathematics. In some cases, these models require massive amounts of calculations (usually floating-point) and are often executed on supercomputers or distributed computing platforms.

== The computational scientist ==
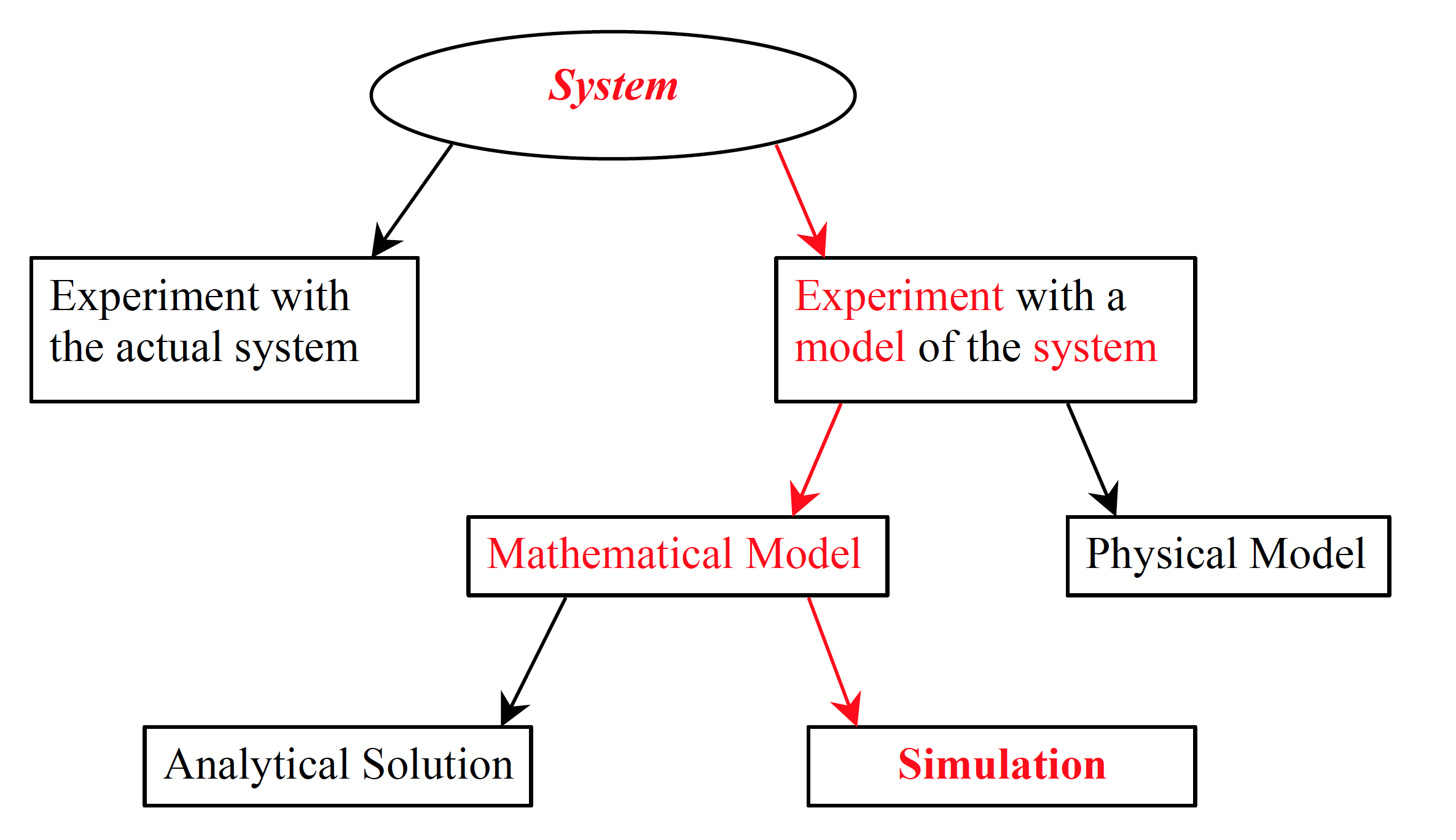
Ways to study a system

The term computational scientist is used to describe someone skilled in scientific computing. Such a person is usually a scientist, an engineer, or an applied mathematician who applies high-performance computing in different ways to advance the state-of-the-art in their respective applied disciplines.

Computational science is now commonly considered a third mode of science, complementing and adding to experimentation/observation and theory (see image). Here, one defines a system as a potential source of data, an experiment as a process of extracting data from a system by exerting it through its inputs and a model (M) for a system (S) and an experiment (E) as anything to which E can be applied in order to answer questions about S. A computational scientist should be capable of:

- recognizing complex problems
- adequately conceptualizing the system containing these problems
- designing a framework of algorithms suitable for studying this system: the simulation
- choosing a suitable computing infrastructure (parallel computing/grid computing/supercomputers)
- hereby, maximizing the computational power of the simulation
- assessing to what level the output of the simulation resembles the systems: the model is validated
- adjusting the conceptualization of the system accordingly
- repeat the cycle until a suitable level of validation is obtained: the computational scientist trusts that the simulation generates adequately realistic results for the system under the studied conditions

Substantial effort in computational sciences has been devoted to developing algorithms, efficient implementation in programming languages, and validating computational results. A collection of problems and solutions in computational science can be found in Steeb, Hardy, Hardy, and Stoop (2004).

Philosophers of science, among them Humphreys and Gelfert, addressed the question: "to what degree does computational science qualify as science?" They address the general question of epistemology: how does gain insight from such computational science approaches? Tolk uses these insights to show the epistemological constraints of computer-based simulation research. As computational science uses mathematical models representing the underlying theory in executable form, in essence, they apply modeling (theory building) and simulation (implementation and execution). While simulation and computational science are our most sophisticated way to express our knowledge and understanding, they also come with all constraints and limits already known for computational solutions.

== Applications of computational science ==
Problem domains for computational science/scientific computing include:

=== Predictive computational science ===
Predictive computational science is a scientific discipline concerned with the formulation, calibration, numerical solution, and validation of mathematical models designed to predict specific aspects of physical events, given initial and boundary conditions, and a set of characterizing parameters and associated uncertainties. In typical cases, the predictive statement is formulated in terms of probabilities. For example, given a mechanical component and a periodic loading condition, "the probability is (say) 90% that the number of cycles at failure (Nf) will be in the interval N1<Nf<N2".

=== Urban complex systems ===
Cities are massively complex systems created by humans, made up of humans, and governed by humans. Computational models and simulations are used to study urban development and city dynamics.

=== Computational finance ===
In financial markets, huge volumes of interdependent assets are traded by a large number of interacting market participants in different locations and time zones. Their behavior is complex and the characterization and measurement of the risk inherent to this diverse set of instruments is typically based on complicated mathematical and computational models. Solving these models exactly, even at a single instrument level, is typically not possible, making the use of numerical algorithms necessary. This has become even more urgent and complex recently, as the credit crisis has clearly demonstrated the role of cascading effects going from single instruments through portfolios of single institutions to even the interconnected trading network. Understanding this requires a multi-scale and holistic approach where interdependent risk factors such as market, credit, and liquidity risk are modeled simultaneously and at different interconnected scales.

=== Computational biology ===
New developments in biotechnology are now revolutionizing biology and biomedical research. Examples of these techniques are high-throughput sequencing, high-throughput quantitative PCR, intra-cellular imaging, in-situ hybridization of gene expression, three-dimensional imaging techniques like Light Sheet Fluorescence Microscopy, and Optical Projection (micro)-Computer Tomography. Given the massive amounts of complicated data that is generated by these techniques, their meaningful interpretation, and even their storage, form major challenges calling for new approaches. Going beyond current bioinformatics approaches, computational biology needs to develop new methods to discover meaningful patterns in these large data sets. Model-based reconstruction of gene networks can be used to organize the gene expression data in a systematic way and to guide further data collection. A major challenge here is to understand how gene regulation is controlling fundamental biological processes like biomineralization and embryogenesis. The sub-processes like gene regulation, organic molecules interacting with the mineral deposition process, cellular processes, physiology, and other processes at the tissue and environmental levels are linked. Rather than being directed by a central control mechanism, biomineralization and embryogenesis can be viewed as an emergent behavior resulting from a complex system, in which several sub-processes on very different temporal and spatial scales (ranging from nanometer and nanoseconds to meters and years) are connected into a multi-scale system. One of the few available options to understand such systems is by developing a multi-scale model of the system.

=== Complex systems theory ===
Using information theory, non-equilibrium dynamics, and explicit simulations, computational systems theory tries to uncover the true nature of complex adaptive systems.

=== Computational science and engineering ===
Computational science and engineering (CSE) is a relatively new discipline that deals with the development and application of computational models and simulations, often coupled with high-performance computing, to solve complex physical problems arising in engineering analysis and design (computational engineering) as well as natural phenomena (computational science). CSE has become accepted amongst scientists, engineers and academics as the "third mode of discovery" (next to theory and experimentation). In many fields, computer simulation is integral and therefore essential to business and research. Computer simulation provides the capability to enter fields that are either inaccessible to traditional experimentation or where carrying out traditional empirical inquiries is prohibitively expensive. CSE should neither be confused with pure computer science, nor with computer engineering, although a wide domain in the former is used in CSE (e.g., certain algorithms, data structures, parallel programming, high-performance computing), and some problems in the latter can be modeled and solved with CSE methods (as an application area).

== Methods and algorithms ==
Algorithms and mathematical methods used in computational science are varied. They are usually categorized as Computer algebra, including symbolic computation in fields such as statistics, equation solving, algebra, calculus, geometry, linear algebra, tensor analysis (multilinear algebra), optimization; or Numerical analysis, including:

- Computing derivatives by finite differences
- Application of Taylor series as convergent and asymptotic series
- Computing derivatives by Automatic differentiation (AD)
- Finite element method for solving PDEs
- High order difference approximations via Taylor series and Richardson extrapolation
- Methods of integration on a uniform mesh: rectangle rule (also called midpoint rule), trapezoid rule, Simpson's rule
- Runge–Kutta methods for solving ordinary differential equations
- Newton's method
- Discrete Fourier transform
- Monte Carlo methods
- Numerical linear algebra, including decompositions and eigenvalue algorithms
- Linear programming
- Branch and cut
- Branch and bound
- Molecular dynamics, Car–Parrinello molecular dynamics
- Space mapping
- Time stepping methods for dynamical systems

Historically and today, Fortran remains popular for most applications of scientific computing. Other programming languages and computer algebra systems commonly used for the more mathematical aspects of scientific computing applications include GNU Octave, Haskell, Julia, Maple, Mathematica, MATLAB, Python (with third-party SciPy library), Perl (with third-party PDL library), R, Scilab, and TK Solver. The more computationally intensive aspects of scientific computing will often use some variation of C or Fortran and optimized algebra libraries such as BLAS or LAPACK. In addition, parallel computing is heavily used in scientific computing to find solutions of large problems in a reasonable amount of time. In this framework, the problem is either divided over many cores on a single CPU node (such as with OpenMP), divided over many CPU nodes networked together (such as with MPI), or is run on one or more GPUs (typically using either CUDA or OpenCL).

Computational science application programs often model real-world changing conditions, such as weather, airflow around a plane, automobile body distortions in a crash, the motion of stars in a galaxy, an explosive device, etc. Such programs might create a 'logical mesh' in computer memory where each item corresponds to an area in space and contains information about that space relevant to the model. For example, in weather models, each item might be a square kilometer; with land elevation, current wind direction, humidity, temperature, pressure, etc. The program would calculate the likely next state based on the current state, in simulated time steps, solving differential equations that describe how the system operates, and then repeat the process to calculate the next state.

=== Artificial intelligence ===
In April 2024, the Scientific Advice Mechanism to the European Commission published advice including a comprehensive evidence review of the opportunities and challenges posed by AI in scientific research.

As benefits, the evidence review highlighted AI's role in accelerating research and innovation, its capacity to automate workflows, and its ability to enhance dissemination of scientific work. As challenges, the review highlighted limitations and risks (specifically around transparency, reproducibility, and interpretability), poor performance (inaccuracy), risk of harm through misuse or unintended use, as well as societal concerns, including the spread of misinformation and increasing inequalities.

== Conferences and journals ==
In 2001, the International Conference on Computational Science (ICCS) was first organized. Since then, it has been organized yearly. ICCS is an A-rank conference in the CORE ranking.

The Journal of Computational Science published its first issue in May 2010. The Journal of Open Research Software was launched in 2012. The ReScience C initiative, which is dedicated to replicating computational results, was started on GitHub in 2015.

== Education ==
At some institutions, a specialization in scientific computation can be earned as a "minor" within another program (which may be at varying levels). However, there are increasingly many bachelor's, master's, and doctoral programs in computational science. The joint degree program master program computational science at the University of Amsterdam and the Vrije Universiteit in computational science was first offered in 2004. In this program, students:

- learn to build computational models from real-life observations;
- develop skills in turning these models into computational structures and in performing large-scale simulations;
- learn theories that will give a firm basis for the analysis of complex systems;
- learn to analyze the results of simulations in a virtual laboratory using advanced numerical algorithms.

ETH Zurich offers a bachelor's and master's degree in Computational Science and Engineering. The degree equips students with the ability to understand scientific problem and apply numerical methods to solve such problems. The directions of specializations include Physics, Chemistry, Biology and other Scientific and Engineering disciplines.

The Ph.D. in Scientific Computing at the University of Michigan was established in 1988. George Mason University has offered a multidisciplinary doctorate Ph.D. program in Computational Sciences and Informatics starting from 1992.

The School of Computational and Integrative Sciences, Jawaharlal Nehru University (erstwhile School of Information Technology) also offers a master's science program for computational science with two specialties: Computational Biology and Complex Systems.

=== Subfields ===
- Bioinformatics
- Car–Parrinello molecular dynamics
- Cheminformatics
- Chemometrics
- Computational archaeology
- Computational astrophysics
- Computational biology
- Computational chemistry
- Computational materials science
- Computational economics
- Computational electromagnetics
- Computational engineering
- Computational finance
- Computational fluid dynamics
- Computational forensics
- Computational geophysics
- Computational history
- Computational informatics
- Computational intelligence
- Computational law
- Computational linguistics
- Computational mathematics
- Computational mechanics
- Computational neuroscience
- Computational particle physics
- Computational physics
- Computational sociology
- Computational statistics
- Computational sustainability
- Computer algebra
- Computer simulation
- Financial modeling
- Geographic information science
  - Geographic information system (GIS)
- High-performance computing
- Machine learning
- Network analysis
- Neuroinformatics
- Numerical linear algebra
- Numerical weather prediction
- Pattern recognition
- Scientific visualization
- Simulation

== See also ==
- Computational science and engineering
- Modeling and simulation
- Comparison of computer algebra systems
- Differentiable programming
- List of molecular modeling software
- List of numerical analysis software
- List open-source science software packages
- List of science software
- List of statistical packages
- Timeline of scientific computing
- Simulated reality
- Extensions for Scientific Computation (XSC)

== Additional sources ==
- E. Gallopoulos and A. Sameh, "CSE: Content and Product". IEEE Computational Science and Engineering Magazine, 4(2):39–43 (1997)
- G. Hager and G. Wellein, Introduction to High Performance Computing for Scientists and Engineers, Chapman and Hall (2010)
- A.K. Hartmann, Practical Guide to Computer Simulations, World Scientific (2009)
- Journal Computational Methods in Science and Technology (open access), Polish Academy of Sciences
- Journal Computational Science and Discovery, Institute of Physics
- R.H. Landau, C.C. Bordeianu, and M. Jose Paez, A Survey of Computational Physics: Introductory Computational Science, Princeton University Press (2008)
