= Mallock =

Mallock is a surname. Notable people with the surname include:

- Arnulph Mallock (1851–1933), British scientific instrument designer and experimentalist
- Michael Mallock (born 1982), English racing driver
- Rawlin Mallock (1649-1691), member of the Parliament of England
- Richard Mallock (1843-1900), member of the House of Commons
- Vivien Mallock (born 1945), English sculptor
- William Hurrell Mallock (1849–1923), English novelist and economics writer

== See also ==
- Mallock machine, an electrical analog computer built by Rawlyn Richard Manconchy Mallock
