= Jacobi matrix =

Jacobi matrix may refer to:

- Jacobian matrix and determinant of a smooth map between Euclidean spaces or smooth manifolds
- Jacobi operator (Jacobi matrix), a tridiagonal symmetric matrix appearing in the theory of orthogonal polynomials
