= Gerhard Hessenberg =

German mathematician (1874–1925)

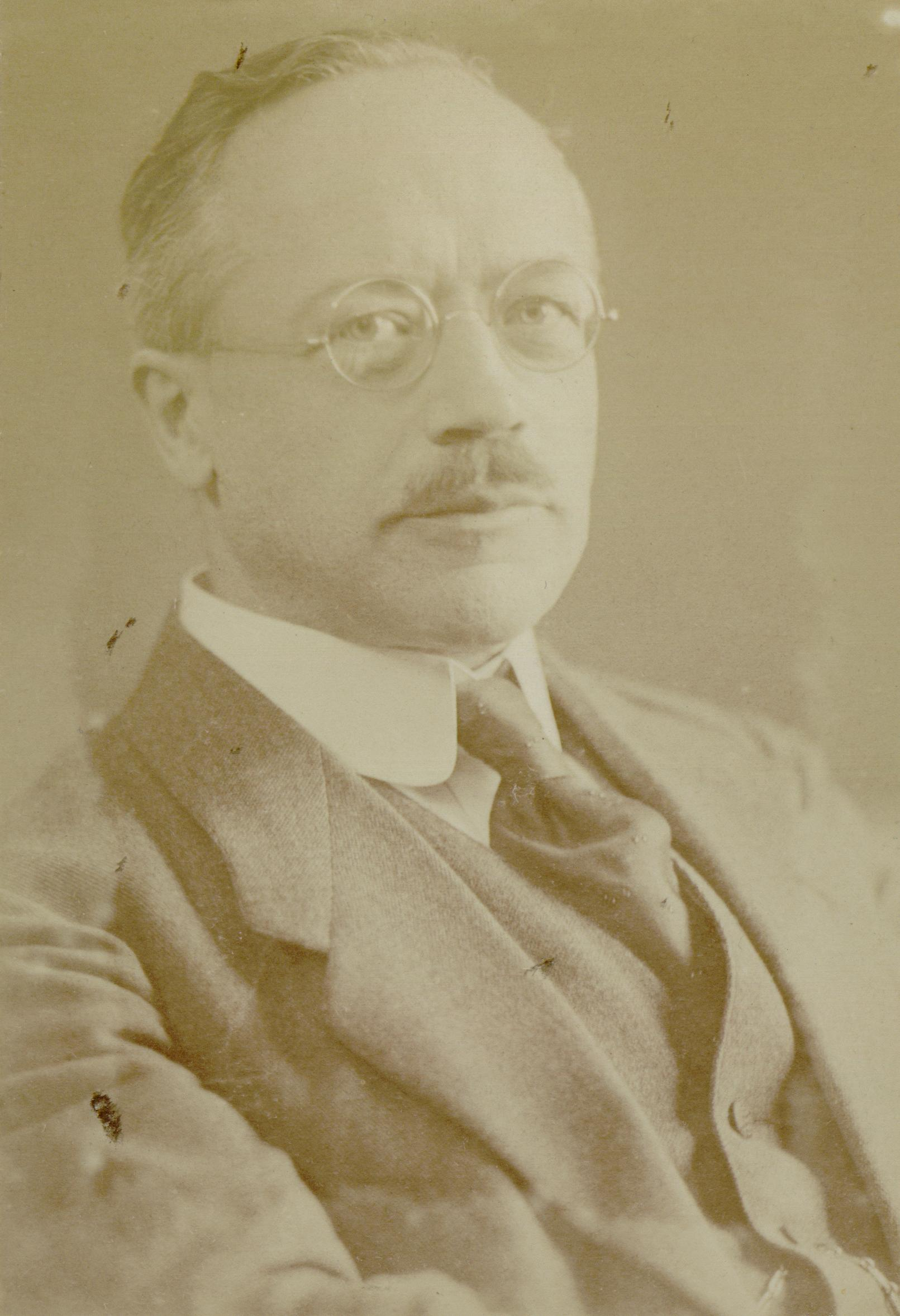
- Hessenberg in May 1921
- Born: 16 August 1874; Frankfurt
- Died: 16 November 1925 (aged 51); Berlin
- Education: University of Berlin
- Known for: Hessenberg sum and product
- Scientific career
- Fields: Mathematics
- Workplaces: University of Breslau
- Thesis: Über die Invarianten linearer und quadratischer binärer Differentialformen und ihre Anwendung auf die Deformation der Flächen (1899)
- Doctoral advisor: Hermann Schwarz; Lazarus Fuchs

Gerhard Hessenberg (German: [ˈɡɛʁhart ˈhɛsn̩ˌbɛʁk]; 16 August 1874 – 16 November 1925) was a German mathematician who worked in projective geometry, differential geometry, and set theory.

== Career ==
Hessenberg received his Ph.D. from the University of Berlin in 1899 under the guidance of Hermann Schwarz and Lazarus Fuchs.

His name is usually associated with projective geometry, where he is known for proving that Desargues' theorem is a consequence of Pappus's hexagon theorem, and differential geometry where he is known for introducing the concept of a connection. He was also a set theorist: the Hessenberg sum and product of ordinals are named after him. However, Hessenberg matrices are named for Karl Hessenberg, a near relative.

In 1908 Gerhard Hessenberg was an Invited Speaker of the International Congress of Mathematicians in Rome.

== Publications ==
- Ebene und sphärische Trigonometrie ((several editions) ed.). Berlin: de Gruyter.
- "Grundbegriffe der Mengenlehre". Abhandlungen der Friesschen Schule. Neue Folge. 1: 478–706. (also in book form as a separate publication from Verlag Vandenhoeck und Ruprecht, Göttingen 1906).
- Grundlagen der Geometrie (2nd ed.). Berlin: de Gruyter. 1967.1st ed. Leipzig: B. G. Teubner. 1930.
- Transzendenz von e und π. Ein Beitrag zur höheren Mathematik vom elementaren Standpunkte aus. New York. 1965. (unaltered reprint of the Teubner edition of 1912).
- Vom Sinn der Zahlen. Tübingen/ Leipzig. 1922.
