= Karl Hessenberg =

German mathematician and engineer (1904 - 1959)

Karl Adolf Hessenberg (September 8, 1904 – February 22, 1959) was a German mathematician and engineer. The Hessenberg matrix form is named after him.

== Education ==
From 1925 to 1930 he studied electrical engineering at the Technische Hochschule Darmstadt (today Technische Universität Darmstadt) and graduated with a diploma. From 1931 to 1932 he was an assistant to Alwin Walther at the Technische Hochschule Darmstadt, afterwards he worked at the power station in Worms, Germany. From 1936 he worked as an engineer at AEG, first in Berlin and later in Frankfurt. In 1940 he received his PhD from Alwin Walther at the Technische Hochschule in Darmstadt.

== Family ==
Hessenberg was also the brother of composer Kurt Hessenberg, and the great-grandson of doctor and author Heinrich Hoffmann.

The Hessenberg sum and product of ordinals are named after Gerhard Hessenberg, another mathematician and near relative of Karl Hessenberg.

His father was Eduard Hessenberg, and his mother was Emma Kugler Hessenberg.
