= History of numerical solution of differential equations using computers =

Differential equations, in particular Euler equations, rose in prominence during World War II in calculating the accurate trajectory of ballistics, both rocket-propelled and gun or cannon type projectiles. Originally, mathematicians used the simpler calculus of earlier centuries to determine velocity, thrust, elevation, curve, distance, and other parameters.

New weapons, however, such as Germany's giant cannons, the "Paris Gun" (Encyclopedia Astronautica) and "Big Bertha," and the V-2 rocket, meant that projectiles would travel hundreds of miles in distance and dozens of miles in height, in all weathers. As a result, variables such as diminished wind resistance in thin atmospheres and changes in gravitational pull reduced accuracy using the historic methodology. There was the additional problem of planes that could now fly hundreds of miles an hour. Differential equations were applied to stochastic processes. Developing machines that could speed up human calculation of differential equations led in part to the creation of the modern computer through the efforts of Vannevar Bush, John von Neumann and others.

According to Mary Croarken in her paper "Computing in Britain During World War II," by 1945, the Cambridge Mathematical Laboratory created by John Lennard-Jones utilized the latest computing devices to perform the equations. These devices included a model "differential analyser," and the Mallock machine, described as "an electrical simultaneous equation solver." According to Croarken, the Ministry was also interested in the new arrival of a differential analyzer accommodating eight integrators. This exotic computing device built by Metropolitan-Vickers in 1939 consisted of wheel and disk mechanisms that could provide descriptions and solutions for differential equations. Output resulted in a plotted graph.

At the same time, in the United States, analog computer pioneer Vannevar Bush took on a similar role to that of Lennard-Jones in the military effort after President Franklin Delano Roosevelt entrusted him with the bulk of wartime research into automatic control of fire power using machines and computing devices.

According to Sarah Bergbreiter in her paper "Moving from Practice to Theory: Automatic Control after World War II," fire control for the downing of enemy aircraft by anti-aircraft guns was the priority. The analog electro-mechanical computing machines plotted the differential firing data while servos created by H.L. Hazen adapted the data to the guns for precise firing control and accuracy. Other improvements of a similar type by Bell Labs increased firing stability so that output from the differential engines could be fully used to compensate for stochastic behaviors of enemy aircraft and large guns. A new age of intelligent warfare had begun.

This work at MIT and Bell Labs would later lead to Norbert Wiener's development of the electronic computer and the science of cybernetics for the same purpose, speeding the differential calculation process exponentially and taking one more giant step toward the creation of the modern digital computer using von Neumann architecture. Dr. von Neumann was one of the original mathematicians employed in the development of differential equations for ballistic warfare.

== See also ==
- Numerical ordinary differential equations
- Numerical partial differential equations
