= Computational informatics =

Computational informatics is a subfield of informatics that emphasizes issues in the design of computing solutions rather than its underlying infrastructure. Computational informatics can also be interpreted as the use of computational methods in the information sciences.

== Development ==
From a historical viewpoint, medical informatics scientists (also known as medical informaticians) started to use artificial intelligence and Bayesian statistical methods in diagnosis and medical decision making, as early as in the 1970s. An example is the MYCIN system developed at Stanford University. The field has since evolved to use a wide range of computational methods and to interact with all possible scientific and other disciplinary domains. Later, the field integrated the following:

- Computational techniques: artificial intelligence, algorithms (for architectures ranging from single CPU to massively parallel machines), programming, object-oriented system design, databases, information retrieval, computer graphics and visualization, data mining, information extraction.
- Probability, statistics and decision science: Theory of probability, statistical inference, cost/risk-benefit analysis, probabilistic analysis, stochastic modeling, decision theory, statistical data analysis, probabilistic networks, pattern classification, statistical learning and modeling, statistical data mining.
- Applied mathematics: graph theory, differential equations, optimization theory, wavelets, group theory.
- Electrical engineering methods: signal and image processing.
- Domain knowledge: art and cultural heritage, biology, chemistry, engineering, medicine, the World Wide Web.
- User sciences: design, human-computer interaction, evaluation.
- Cyberinfrastructure for informatics: search engines, digital repositories, storage.
- Scientometrics, bibliometrics and economics: science and policy evaluation, data mining and information extraction, knowledge discovery.
- Social sciences: social network analysis and metrics.

== Education ==
Several universities offer graduate programs in this area. One example is the Penn State College of Information Sciences and Technology. Another example is the Hamburg University of Technology which offers a consecutive Bachelor and Master program with emphasis on computational techniques. Some programs are targeted at specific domains. For instance, the Biomedical Informatics Program at Stanford University focuses on technologies and methods for understanding biomedical data and to improve health care.

In Tunisia, University of Manouba offers a Master program called Intelligent and Decisional Informatics which tries to cover all aspect of computational informatics.

== See also ==
- Bioinformatics
