= Folded spectrum method =

Mathematical method for solving large eigenvalue problems

In mathematics, the folded spectrum method (FSM) is an iterative method for solving large eigenvalue problems. Here you always find a vector with an eigenvalue close to a search-value $\varepsilon$. This means you can get a vector $\Psi$ in the middle of the spectrum without solving the matrix.

$\Psi_{i+1}= \Psi_i-\alpha( H- \varepsilon \mathbf{1} )^2 \Psi_i$, with $0<\alpha^{\,}<1$ and $\mathbf{1}$ the Identity matrix.

In contrast to the Conjugate gradient method, here the gradient calculates by twice multiplying matrix $H:\;G\sim H\rightarrow G\sim H^2.$

== Literature ==
- MacDonald, J. K. L. (1934-11-01). "On the Modified Ritz Variation Method". Physical Review. 46 (9). American Physical Society (APS): 828. Bibcode:1934PhRv...46..828M. doi:10.1103/physrev.46.828. ISSN 0031-899X.
- Wang, Lin Wang; Zunger, Alex (1994). "Electronic Structure Pseudopotential Calculations of Large (.apprx.1000 Atoms) Si Quantum Dots". The Journal of Physical Chemistry. 98 (8). American Chemical Society (ACS): 2158–2165. doi:10.1021/j100059a032. ISSN 0022-3654.
- Wang, Lin-Wang; Zunger, Alex (1994). "Solving Schrödinger's equation around a desired energy: Application to silicon quantum dots". The Journal of Chemical Physics. 100 (3). AIP Publishing: 2394–2397. Bibcode:1994JChPh.100.2394W. doi:10.1063/1.466486. ISSN 0021-9606.
- https://web.archive.org/web/20070806144253/http://www.sst.nrel.gov/topics/nano/escan.html
