= Jacobi operator =

Linear operator

A Jacobi operator, also known as Jacobi matrix, is a symmetric linear operator acting on sequences which is given by an infinite tridiagonal matrix. It is commonly used to specify systems of orthonormal polynomials over a finite, positive Borel measure. This operator is named after Carl Gustav Jacob Jacobi.

The name derives from a theorem from Jacobi, dating to 1848, stating that every symmetric matrix over a principal ideal domain is congruent to a tridiagonal matrix.

== Self-adjoint Jacobi operators ==
The most important case is the one of self-adjoint Jacobi operators acting on the Hilbert space of square summable sequences over the positive integers $\ell^2(\mathbb{N})$. In this case it is given by

$$Jf_0 = a_0 f_1 + b_0 f_0, \quad Jf_n =  a_n f_{n+1} + b_n f_n + a_{n-1} f_{n-1}, \quad n>0,$$

where the coefficients are assumed to satisfy

$$a_n >0, \quad b_n \in \mathbb{R}.$$

The operator will be bounded if and only if the coefficients are bounded.

There are close connections with the theory of orthogonal polynomials. In fact, the solution $p_n(x)$ of the recurrence relation

$$J\, p_n(x) = x\, p_n(x), \qquad p_0(x)=1 \text{ and } p_{-1} (x)=0,$$

is a polynomial of degree n and these polynomials are orthonormal with respect to the spectral measure corresponding to the first basis vector $\delta_{1,n}$.

This recurrence relation is also commonly written as

$$xp_n(x)=a_{n+1}p_{n+1}(x) + b_n p_n(x) + a_np_{n-1}(x)$$

== Applications ==
It arises in many areas of mathematics and physics. The case a(n) = 1 is known as the discrete one-dimensional Schrödinger operator. It also arises in:

- The Lax pair of the Toda lattice.
- The three-term recurrence relationship of orthogonal polynomials, orthogonal over a positive and finite Borel measure.
- Algorithms devised to calculate Gaussian quadrature rules, derived from systems of orthogonal polynomials.
- The theory of birth-death processes where the infinite transition matrix can be transformed into a self-adjoint Jacobi operator acting on the Hilbert space $\ell^2(\mathbb{C})$.

== Generalizations ==
When one considers Bergman space, namely the space of square-integrable holomorphic functions over some domain, then, under general circumstances, one can give that space a basis of orthogonal polynomials, the Bergman polynomials. In this case, the analog of the tridiagonal Jacobi operator is a Hessenberg operator – an infinite-dimensional Hessenberg matrix. The system of orthogonal polynomials is given by

$$zp_n(z)=\sum_{k=0}^{n+1} D_{kn} p_k(z)$$

and $p_0(z)=1$. Here, D is the Hessenberg operator that generalizes the tridiagonal Jacobi operator J for this situation. Note that D is the right-shift operator on the Bergman space: that is, it is given by

$$[Df](z) = zf(z)$$

The zeros of the Bergman polynomial $p_n(z)$ correspond to the eigenvalues of the principal $n\times n$ submatrix of D. That is, The Bergman polynomials are the characteristic polynomials for the principal submatrices of the shift operator.

== See also ==
- Hankel matrix
