= Mallock machine =

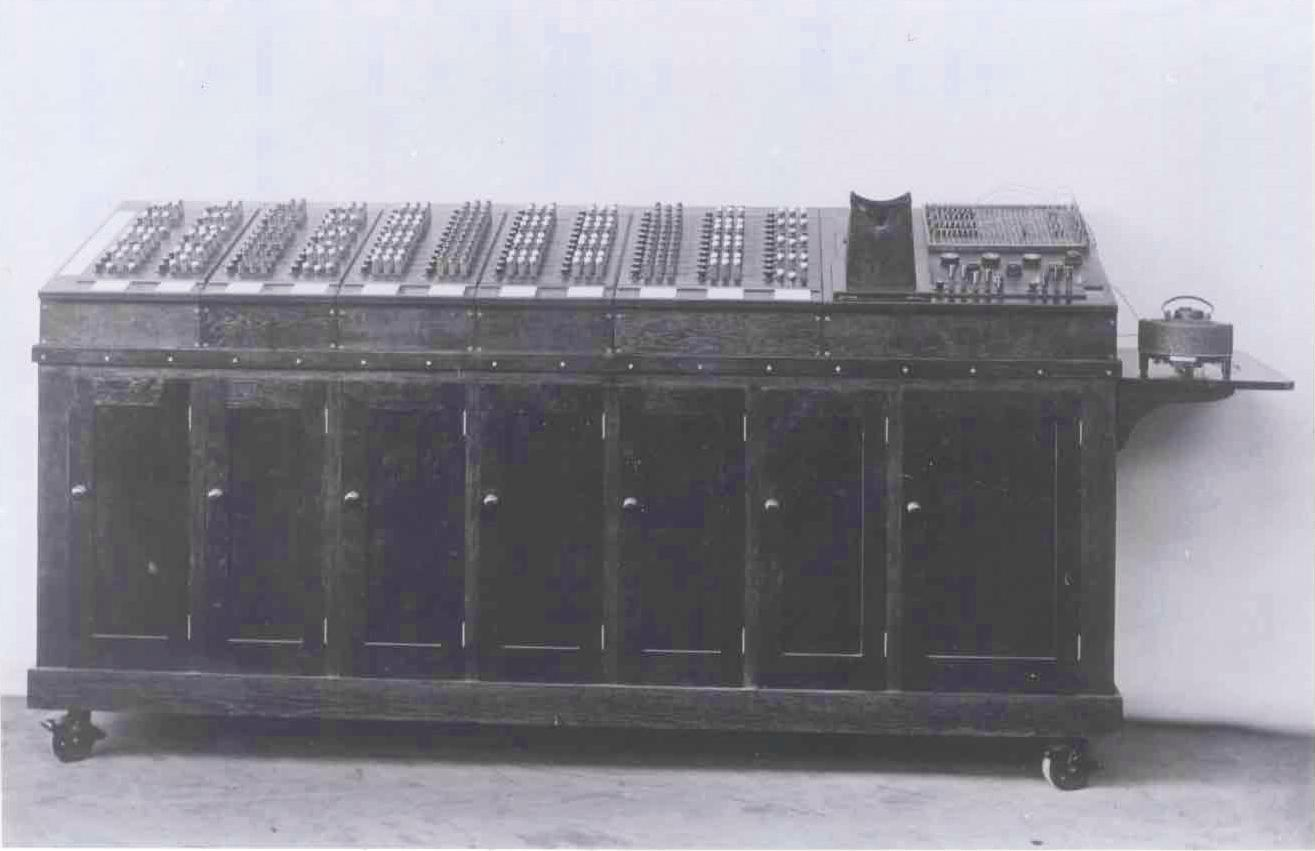
Mallock machine, 1933

The Mallock machine is an electrical analog computer built in 1933 to solve simultaneous linear differential equations. It uses coupled current transformers that uses alternating currents(AC) that correspond to the number of unknowns, with numbers of turns(that correspond to the coefficients) digitally set up to ±1000 and solved sets of up to 10 linear differential equations. It was built by Rawlyn Richard Manconchy Mallock of Cambridge University. The Mallock machine was contemporary with the mechanical differential analyser, which was also used at Cambridge during the late 1930s and 1940s.
