= John G. F. Francis =

English computer scientist

John G.F. Francis
- Born: 1934 (age 91–92); London
- Known for: QR algorithm

John G.F. Francis (born 1934) is an English computer scientist, who in 1961 published the QR algorithm for computing the eigenvalues and eigenvectors of matrices, which has been named as one of the ten most important algorithms of the twentieth century. The algorithm was also proposed independently by Vera N. Kublanovskaya of the Soviet Union in the same year.

Francis was born in London in 1934. In 1954 he worked for the National Research Development Corporation (NRDC). In 1955–1956 he attended Cambridge University, but did not complete a degree. He then returned to the NRDC, where he served as assistant to Christopher Strachey. At this time he devised the QR transformation. In 1961 he left the NRDC to work at Ferranti Corporation, Ltd. and then at the University of Sussex. Subsequently, he had positions with various industrial organizations and consultancies. His interests encompassed artificial intelligence, computer languages, and systems engineering, although he never returned to the field of numerical computation.

By 1962, Francis had left the field of numerical analysis, and subsequently had no idea of the impact his work on the QR algorithm had had, until re-contacted by Gene Golub and Frank Uhlig in 2007, by which time he was retired and living in Hove, England (near Brighton). Still in good health, he was the opening speaker at a mini-symposium that marked 50 years of the QR algorithm, held at the 23rd Biennial Conference on Numerical Analysis in Glasgow in June 2009. Francis was awarded a University of Sussex honorary doctorate in July 2015.
