= Vera Kublanovskaya =

Russian mathematician (1920–2012)

Vera Nikolaevna Kublanovskaya (née Totubalina; November 21, 1920 – February 21, 2012) was a Russian mathematician noted for her work on developing computational methods for solving spectral problems of algebra. She proposed the QR algorithm for computing eigenvalues and eigenvectors in 1961, which has been named as one of the ten most important algorithms of the twentieth century. This algorithm was proposed independently by the English computer scientist John G.F. Francis in 1961.

== Early life ==
Kublanovskaya was born in November 1920 in Krokhona, a village near Belozersk in Vologda Oblast, Russian Soviet Federative Socialist Republic. She was born in a farming and fishing family as one of nine siblings. She died at the age of 91 years old in February 2012.

== Education ==
Kublanovskaya started her tertiary education in 1939 at the Gertzen Pedagogical Institute in Leningrad. There, she was encouraged to pursue a career in mathematics. She moved on to study mathematics at Leningrad State University in 1945 and graduated in 1948. Following her graduation, she joined the Leningrad Branch of the Steklov Mathematical Institute of the USSR Academy of Sciences. She remained there for 64 years of her life.

In 1955, she got her first doctorate degree on the application of analytic continuation to numeric methods. In 1972 she obtained a secondary doctorate on the use of orthogonal transformations to solve algebraic problems.

In October 1985, she was awarded an honorary doctorate at Umeå University, Sweden, with which she has collaborated.

== Scientific works ==
During her first PhD, she joined Leonid Kantorovich's group that was working on developing a universal computer language in the USSR. Her task was to select and classify matrix operations that are useful in numerical linear algebra.

== Publications ==
- On some algorithms for the solution of the complete eigenvalue problem
- On a method of solving the complete eigenvalue problem for a degenerate matrix
- Methods and algorithms of solving spectral problems for polynomial and rational matrices
- To solving problems of algebra for two-parameter matrices. V
- To solving problems of algebra for two-parameter matrices. IX
