= Andrei Knyazev (mathematician) =

American mathematician

Andrew Knyazev
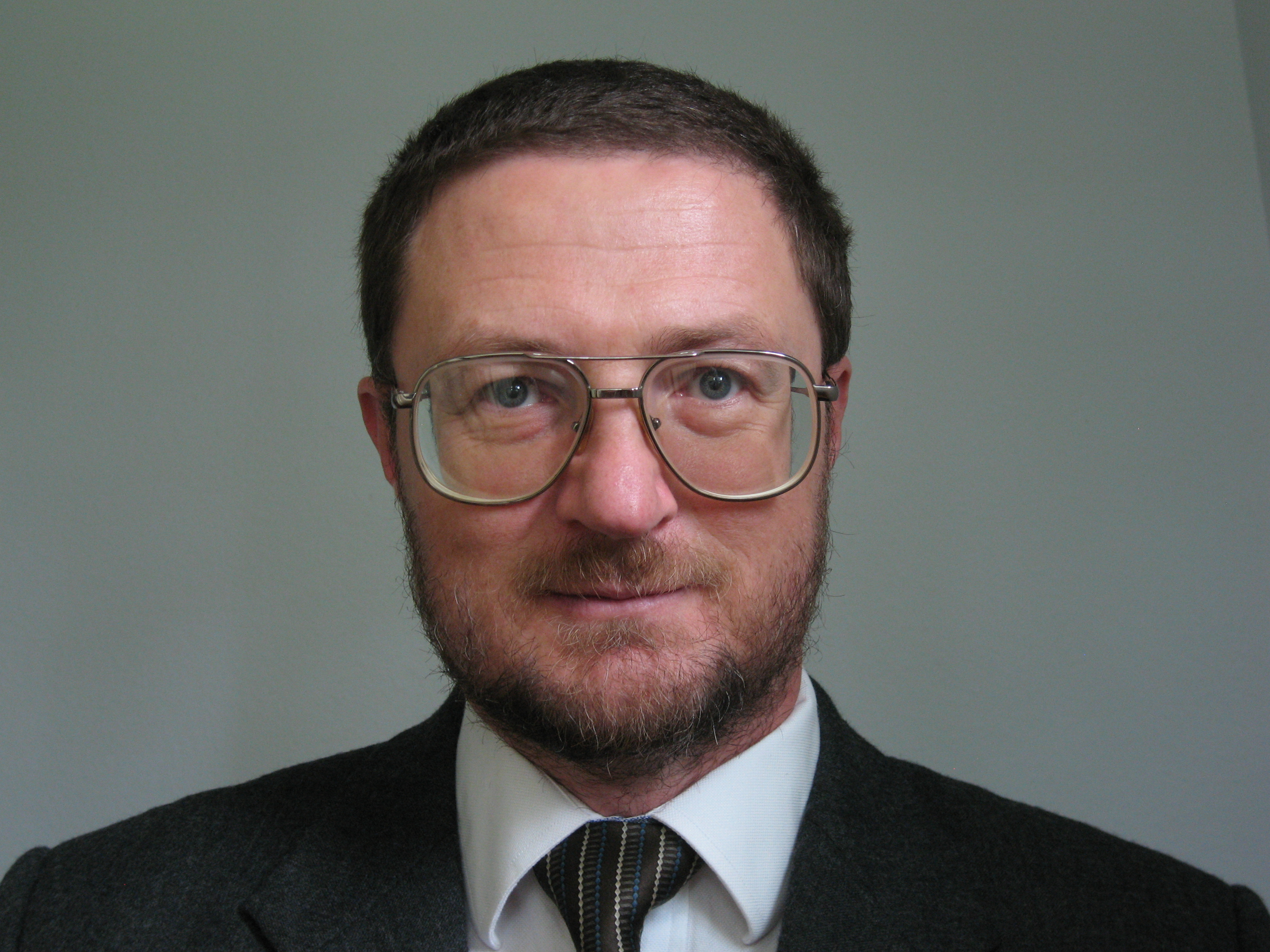
- Andrew Knyazev
- Born: Moscow, Soviet Union
- Education: Moscow State University
- Known for: eigenvalue solvers
- Awards: IEEE Senior Member (2013); Professor Emeritus University of Colorado Denver (2016); SIAM Fellow (2016); AMS Fellow (2019)
- Scientific career
- Fields: Numerical analysis, Applied Mathematics, Computer Science
- Workplaces: Kurchatov Institute; Institute of Numerical Mathematics Russian Academy of Sciences; Courant Institute of Mathematical Sciences New York University; University of Colorado Denver; Mitsubishi Electric Research Laboratories
- Doctoral advisor: Vyacheslav Ivanovich Lebedev
- Website: https://www.linkedin.com/in/andrew-knyazev/

Andrew Knyazev is an American mathematician. He graduated from the Faculty of Computational Mathematics and Cybernetics of Moscow State University under the supervision of Evgenii Georgievich D'yakonov (Russian: Евгений Георгиевич Дьяконов) in 1981 and obtained his PhD in Numerical Mathematics at the Russian Academy of Sciences under the supervision of Vyacheslav Ivanovich Lebedev (Russian: Вячеслав Иванович Лебедев) in 1985. He worked at the Kurchatov Institute between 1981–1983, and then to 1992 at the Marchuk Institute of Numerical Mathematics (Russian: ru:Институт вычислительной математики имени Г. И. Марчука РАН) of the Russian Academy of Sciences, headed by Gury Marchuk (Russian: Гурий Иванович Марчук).

From 1993–1994, Knyazev held a visiting position at the Courant Institute of Mathematical Sciences of New York University, collaborating with Olof B. Widlund. From 1994 until retirement in 2014, he was a Professor of Mathematics at the University of Colorado Denver, supported by the National Science Foundation and United States Department of Energy grants. He was a recipient of the 2008 Excellence in Research Award, the 2000 college Teaching Excellence Award, and a finalist of the CU President's Faculty Excellence Award for Advancing Teaching and Learning through Technology in 1999. He was awarded the title of Professor Emeritus at the University of Colorado Denver and named the SIAM Fellow Class of 2016 and AMS Fellow Class of 2019.

From 2012–2018, Knyazev worked at the Mitsubishi Electric Research Laboratories on algorithms for image and video processing, data sciences, optimal control, and material sciences, resulting in dozens of publications and 13 patent applications. Since 2018, he contributed to numerical techniques in quantum computing at Zapata Computing, real-time embedded anomaly detection in automotive data, and algorithms for silicon photonics-based hardware.

Knyazev is mostly known for his work in numerical solution of large sparse eigenvalue problems, particularly preconditioning and the iterative method LOBPCG. Knyazev's implementation of LOBPCG is available in many open source software packages, e.g., BLOPEX, SciPy, and ABINIT.

Knyazev collaborated with John Osborn on the theory of the Ritz method in the finite element method context and with Nikolai Sergeevich Bakhvalov (Russian: Николай Серге́евич Бахвалов) (Erdős number 3 via Leonid Kantorovich) on numerical solution of elliptic partial differential equations with large jumps in the main coefficients. Jointly with his Ph.D. students, Knyazev pioneered using majorization for bounds in the Rayleigh–Ritz method (see and references there) and contributed to the theory of angles between flats.
