= METIS =

Software package for graph partitioning

METIS is a software package for graph partitioning that implements various multilevel algorithms. METIS' multilevel approach has three phases and comes with several algorithms for each phase:

1. Coarsen the graph by generating a sequence of graphs G_{0}, G_{1}, ..., G_{N}, where G_{0} is the original graph and for each 0 ≤ i < j ≤ N, the number of vertices in G_{i} is greater than the number of vertices in G_{j}.
2. Compute a partition of G_{N}
3. Project the partition back through the sequence in the order of G_{N}, ..., G_{0}, refining it with respect to each graph.

The final partition computed during the third phase (the refined partition projected onto G_{0}) is a partition of the original graph.

According to Metis authors Karypis and Kumar, "Metis is the Greek word for wisdom. Metis was a titaness in Greek mythology. She was the consort of Zeus and the mother of Athena. She presided over all wisdom and knowledge".
