= Hypre =

Code library

HYPRE
- Stable release: 2.11.2 / 2017/03/13
- Operating system: Linux, Unix
- Available in: C (main language), C++, FORTRAN
- Type: High-performance Parallel Software for linear systems and eigenvalue problems
- License: LGPL (version 2.1)
- Website: https://computing.llnl.gov/projects/hypre-scalable-linear-solvers-multigrid-methods
- Repository: github.com/hypre-space/hypre

The Parallel High Performance Preconditioners (hypre) is a library of routines for scalable (parallel) solution of linear systems. The built-in BLOPEX package in addition allows solving eigenvalue problems. The main strength of Hypre is availability of high performance parallel multigrid preconditioners for both structured and unstructured grid problems.

Currently, Hypre supports only real double-precision arithmetic. Hypre uses the Message Passing Interface (MPI) standard for all message-passing communication. PETSc has an interface to call Hypre preconditioners.

Hypre is being developed and is supported by members of the Scalable Linear Solvers project within the Lawrence Livermore National Laboratory.

== Features ==
hypre provides the following features:

- Parallel vectors and matrices, using several different interfaces
- Scalable parallel preconditioners
- Built-in BLOPEX

== See also ==
- List of open-source mathematical libraries
