= John E. Osborn (mathematician) =

American mathematician

John Edward Osborn
- John Osborn in April 2009
- Born: July 12, 1936; Onamia, Minnesota, United States
- Died: May 30, 2011 (aged 74); Maryland, USA
- Education: University of Minnesota, Minneapolis
- Known for: Computational mathematics
- Scientific career
- Fields: Mathematics
- Doctoral advisor: Hans Weinberger

John E. Osborn (July 12, 1936 – May 30, 2011) was an American mathematician. He obtained B.S. (1958), M.S. (1963), and Ph.D. (1965) degrees at the University of Minnesota, Minneapolis. His Ph.D. adviser was Hans Weinberger. Osborn made fundamental contributions to computational mathematics, especially to the theory of numerical solution of partial differential equations, eigenvalue approximations, and the finite element method. He also co-authored several textbooks on differential equations and numerical computation with the goal of introducing computation into sophomore level differential equations courses.

Osborn held a faculty position at the University of Maryland, College Park his entire career, from 1965 until retiring in 2008. By 1975 he was a full professor, and took on the role of Mathematics Chair in 1982–1985. He served as acting or interim dean for two years, 1989–90 and 1998–99. He also held many visiting positions worldwide.

He was a frequent collaborator and coauthor of Ivo Babuška.

The Memorial Service for Osborn took place at the University of Maryland's Memorial Chapel on September 21, 2011.

John E. Osborn supervised four PhD students.

== Selected references ==
- Osborn, J.; Robinson, A.; Hsiao, C. C. (1960), "Effect of orientation on strength of model solid", J. Appl. Phys., 31 (9): 1602–1604, Bibcode:1960JAP....31.1602R, doi:10.1063/1.1735900
- Babuska, Ivo; Osborn, John E. (1991), "Eigenvalue Problems", Handbook of Numerical Analysis, vol. II, pp. 641–784, doi:10.1016/s1570-8659(05)80042-0, ISBN 9780444703651
- Coombes, K.; Hunt, B.; Lipsman, R.; Osborn, John E.; Stuck, G. (2000), Differential equations with MATLAB, John Wiley & Sons, Inc.
- Babuska, Ivo; Banerjee, Uday; Osborn, John E. (2003), "Survey of meshless and generalized finite element methods", Acta Numerica, 12: 1–125, doi:10.1017/S0962492902000090
- Babuska, Ivo; Banerjee, Uday; Osborn, John E. (2004), "Generalized Finite Element Method – Main Ideas, Results, and Perspective", International Journal of Computational Methods, 1 (1): 67–103, doi:10.1142/S0219876204000083
- Bourne, David; Elman, Howard; Osborn, John E. (2009), "A non-self-adjoint quadratic eigenvalue problem describing a fluid-solid interaction. {II}. {A}nalysis of convergence", Commun. Pure Appl. Anal., 8 (1): 143–160, doi:10.3934/cpaa.2009.8.143
