= Yevgeny Dyakonov =

Russian mathematician (1935–2006)

Evgenii Georgievich Dyakonov
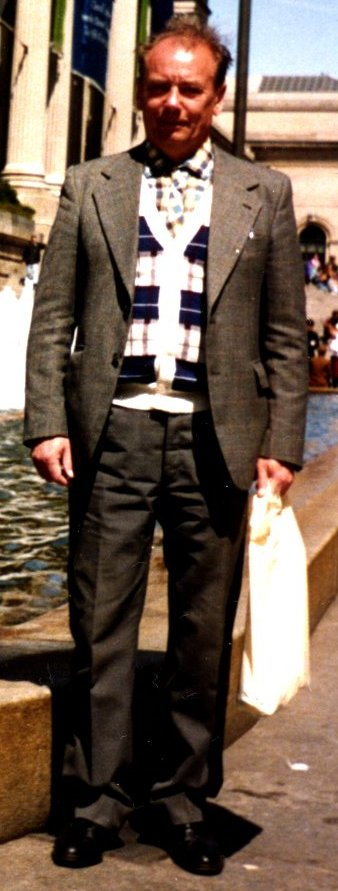
- Evgenii Georgievich Dyakonov
- Born: July 2, 1935; Nevel, Soviet Union
- Died: August 11, 2006 (aged 71); Moscow, Russia
- Occupation: Mathematician
- Known for: spectrally equivalent preconditioning

Evgenii Georgievich Dyakonov (Russian: Евгений Георгиевич Дьяконов) (July 2, 1935 – August 11, 2006) was a Russian mathematician.

Dyakonov was a Ph.D. student of Sergei Sobolev. He worked at the Moscow State University. He authored over hundred papers and several books. Dyakonov was recognized for his pioneering work in the 60s–80s on efficient spectrally equivalent preconditioning for linear systems and eigenvalue problems. In the last decade, strengthened Sobolev spaces became Dyakonov's main topic of research, e.g., (Dyakonov, 2004).
