= Arnoldi =

Arnoldi is a surname. Notable people with the surname include:

- Bartholomaeus Arnoldi (1465–1532), Augustinian friar associated with Martin Luther
- Charles Arnoldi (born 1946), American painter, sculptor and printmaker
- Per Arnoldi (born 1941), Danish designer and artist
- Vladimir Arnoldi (1871–1924), Russian children's writer and biologist
- Walter Edwin Arnoldi (1917–1995), American engineer

== See also ==
- Arnoldi iteration, an algorithm in algebra
- Paa arnoldi, a species of frog
