= Orthonormality =

Property of two or more vectors that are orthogonal and of unit length

In linear algebra, two vectors in an inner product space are orthonormal if they are orthogonal unit vectors. A unit vector means that the vector has a length of 1, which is also known as normalized. Orthogonal means that the two vectors are perpendicular to each other. A set of vectors form an orthonormal set if all vectors in the set are mutually orthogonal and all of unit length. An orthonormal set which forms a basis is called an orthonormal basis.

== Intuitive overview ==
The construction of orthogonality of vectors is motivated by a desire to extend the intuitive notion of perpendicular vectors to higher-dimensional spaces. In the Cartesian plane, two vectors are said to be perpendicular if the angle between them is 90° (i.e. if they form a right angle). This definition can be formalized in Cartesian space by defining the dot product and specifying that two vectors in the plane are orthogonal if their dot product is zero.

Similarly, the construction of the norm of a vector is motivated by a desire to extend the intuitive notion of the length of a vector to higher-dimensional spaces. In Cartesian space, the norm of a vector is the square root of the vector dotted with itself. That is,

$$\| \mathbf{x} \| = \sqrt{ \mathbf{x} \cdot \mathbf{x}}$$

Many important results in linear algebra deal with collections of two or more orthogonal vectors. But often, it is easier to deal with vectors of unit length. That is, it often simplifies things to only consider vectors whose norm equals 1. The notion of restricting orthogonal pairs of vectors to only those of unit length is important enough to be given a special name. Two vectors which are orthogonal and of length 1 are said to be orthonormal.

=== Simple example ===
What does a pair of orthonormal vectors in 2-D Euclidean space look like?

Let u = (x_{1}, y_{1}) and v = (x_{2}, y_{2}). Consider the restrictions on x_{1}, x_{2}, y_{1}, y_{2} required to make u and v form an orthonormal pair.

- From the orthogonality restriction, u • v = 0.
- From the unit length restriction on u, ||u|| = 1.
- From the unit length restriction on v, ||v|| = 1.

Expanding these terms gives 3 equations:

1. $x_1 x_2 + y_1 y_2 = 0 \quad$
2. $\sqrt{{x_1}^2 + {y_1}^2} = 1$
3. $\sqrt{{x_2}^2 + {y_2}^2} = 1$

Converting from Cartesian to polar coordinates, and considering Equation $(2)$ and Equation $(3)$ immediately gives the result r_{1} = r_{2} = 1. In other words, requiring the vectors be of unit length restricts the vectors to lie on the unit circle.

After substitution, Equation $(1)$ becomes $\cos \theta _1 \cos \theta _2 + \sin \theta _1 \sin \theta _2 = 0$. Rearranging gives $\tan \theta _1 = - \cot \theta _2$. Using a trigonometric identity to convert the cotangent term gives

$$\tan ( \theta_1 ) = \tan \left( \theta_2 + \tfrac{\pi}{2} \right)$$
$$\Rightarrow \theta _1 = \theta _2 + \tfrac{\pi}{2}$$

It is clear that in the plane, orthonormal vectors are simply radii of the unit circle whose difference in angles equals 90°.

== Definition ==
Let $\mathcal{V}$ be an inner-product space. A set of vectors

$$\left\{ u_1 , u_2 , \ldots , u_n , \ldots \right\} \in \mathcal{V}$$

is called orthonormal if and only if

$$\forall i,j : \langle u_i , u_j \rangle = \delta_{ij}$$

where $\delta_{ij} \,$ is the Kronecker delta and $\langle \cdot , \cdot \rangle$ is the inner product defined over $\mathcal{V}$.

== Significance ==
Orthonormal sets are not especially significant on their own. However, they display certain features that make them fundamental in exploring the notion of diagonalizability of certain operators on vector spaces.

=== Properties ===
Orthonormal sets have certain very appealing properties, which make them particularly easy to work with.

- Theorem. If {e_{1}, e_{2}, ..., e_{n}} is an orthonormal list of vectors, then
  $$\forall \textbf{a} := [a_1, \cdots, a_n]; \ \|a_1 \textbf{e}_1 + a_2 \textbf{e}_2 + \cdots + a_n \textbf{e}_n\|^2 = |a_1|^2 + |a_2|^2 + \cdots + |a_n|^2$$
- Theorem. Every orthonormal list of vectors is linearly independent.

=== Existence ===
- Gram-Schmidt theorem. If {v_{1}, v_{2},...,v_{n}} is a linearly independent list of vectors in an inner-product space $\mathcal{V}$, then there exists an orthonormal list {e_{1}, e_{2},...,e_{n}} of vectors in $\mathcal{V}$ such that span(e_{1}, e_{2},...,e_{n}) = span(v_{1}, v_{2},...,v_{n}).

Proof of the Gram-Schmidt theorem is constructive, and discussed at length elsewhere. The Gram-Schmidt theorem, together with the axiom of choice, guarantees that every vector space admits an orthonormal basis. This is possibly the most significant use of orthonormality, as this fact permits operators on inner-product spaces to be discussed in terms of their action on the space's orthonormal basis vectors. What results is a deep relationship between the diagonalizability of an operator and how it acts on the orthonormal basis vectors. This relationship is characterized by the Spectral Theorem.

== Examples ==
=== Standard basis ===
The standard basis for the coordinate space F^{n} is

{e_{1}, e_{2},...,e_{n}} where	e_{1} = (1, 0, ..., 0)
	e_{2} = (0, 1, ..., 0)
	$\vdots$
	e_{n} = (0, 0, ..., 1)

Any two vectors e_{i}, e_{j} where i≠j are orthogonal, and all vectors are clearly of unit length. So {e_{1}, e_{2},...,e_{n}} forms an orthonormal basis.

=== Real-valued functions ===
When referring to real-valued functions, usually the L² inner product is assumed unless otherwise stated. Two functions $\phi(x)$ and $\psi(x)$ are orthonormal over the interval $[a,b]$ if

$$(1)\quad\langle\phi(x),\psi(x)\rangle = \int_a^b\phi(x)\psi(x)dx = 0,\quad{\rm and}$$
$$(2)\quad||\phi(x)||_2 = ||\psi(x)||_2 = \left[\int_a^b|\phi(x)|^2dx\right]^\frac{1}{2} = \left[\int_a^b|\psi(x)|^2dx\right]^\frac{1}{2} = 1.$$

=== Fourier series ===
The Fourier series is a method of expressing a periodic function in terms of sinusoidal basis functions. Taking C[−π,π] to be the space of all real-valued functions continuous on the interval [−π,π] and taking the inner product to be

$$\langle f, g \rangle = \int_{-\pi}^{\pi} f(x)g(x)dx$$

it can be shown that

$$\left\{ \frac{1}{\sqrt{2\pi}}, \frac{\sin(x)}{\sqrt{\pi}}, \frac{\sin(2x)}{\sqrt{\pi}}, \ldots, \frac{\sin(nx)}{\sqrt{\pi}}, \frac{\cos(x)}{\sqrt{\pi}}, \frac{\cos(2x)}{\sqrt{\pi}}, \ldots, \frac{\cos(nx)}{\sqrt{\pi}} \right\}, \quad n \in \mathbb{N}$$

forms an orthonormal set.

However, this is of little consequence, because C[−π,π] is infinite-dimensional, and a finite set of vectors cannot span it. But, removing the restriction that n be finite makes the set dense in C[−π,π] and therefore an orthonormal basis of C[−π,π].

== See also ==
- Orthogonalization
- Orthonormal function system

== Sources ==
- Axler, Sheldon (1997), Linear Algebra Done Right (2nd ed.), Berlin, New York: Springer-Verlag, p. 106–110, ISBN 978-0-387-98258-8
- Chen, Wai-Kai (2009), Fundamentals of Circuits and Filters (3rd ed.), Boca Raton: CRC Press, p. 62, ISBN 978-1-4200-5887-1
