= Henk van der Vorst =

Dutch mathematician (born 1944)

Hendrik "Henk" Albertus van der Vorst (born 5 May 1944, Venlo) is a Dutch mathematician and Emeritus Professor of Numerical Analysis at Utrecht University. According to the Institute for Scientific Information (ISI), his paper on the BiCGSTAB method was the most cited paper in the field of mathematics in the 1990s. He is a member of the Royal Netherlands Academy of Arts and Sciences (KNAW) since 2002 and the Netherlands Academy of Technology and Innovation. In 2006 he was awarded a knighthood of the Order of the Netherlands Lion. Henk van der Vorst is a Fellow of Society for Industrial and Applied Mathematics (SIAM).

His major contributions include preconditioned iterative methods, in particular the ICCG (incomplete Cholesky conjugate gradient) method (developed together with Koos Meijerink), a version of preconditioned conjugate gradient method, the BiCGSTAB and (together with Kees Vuik) GMRESR Krylov subspace methods and (together with Gerard Sleijpen) the Jacobi-Davidson method for solving ordinary, generalized, and nonlinear eigenproblems. He has analyzed convergence behavior of the conjugate gradient and Lanczos methods. He has also developed a number of preconditioners for parallel computers, including truncated Neumann series preconditioner, incomplete twisted factorizations, and the incomplete factorization based on the so-called "vdv" ordering.

He is the author of the book Iterative Krylov Methods for Large Linear systems and one of the authors of the Templates projects for linear problems and eigenproblems.
