= Mixed finite element method =

In numerical analysis, a mixed finite element method, is a variant of the finite element method in which extra fields to be solved are introduced during the posing a partial differential equation problem. Somewhat related is the hybrid finite element method. The extra fields may be constrained by using Lagrange multiplier fields. To be distinguished from the mixed finite element method, the more typical finite element methods that do not introduce such extra fields are also called irreducible or primal finite element methods. The mixed finite element method is efficient for some problems that would be numerically ill-posed if discretized by using the irreducible finite element method; one example of such problems is to compute the stress and strain fields in an almost incompressible elastic body.

== Variations ==
=== Constraints ===
In constrained mixed methods, the Lagrange multiplier fields inside the elements, usually enforcing the applicable partial differential equations. This results in a saddle point system having negative pivots and eigenvalues, rendering the system matrix to be non-definite which results in complications in solving for it. In sparse direct solvers, pivoting may be needed, where ultimately the resulting matrix has 2x2 blocks on the diagonal, rather than a working towards a completely pure LL^{H} Cholesky decomposition for positive definite symmetric or Hermitian systems. Pivoting may result in unpredictable memory usage increases. For iterative solvers, only GMRES based solvers work, rather than slightly "cheaper" MINRES based solvers.

=== Hybrid Methods ===
In hybrid methods, the Lagrange fields are for jumps of fields between elements, living on the boundary of the elements, weakly enforcing continuity; continuity from fields in the elements does not need to be enforced through shared degrees of freedom between elements anymore. Both mixing and hybridization can be applied simultaneously. These enforcements are "weak", i.e. occur upon having the solutions and possibly only at some points or e.g. matching moment integral conditions, rather than "strong" in which case the conditions are fulfilled directly in the type of solutions sought. Apart from the harmonics (usually semi-trivial local solution to the homogeneous equations at zero loads), hybridization allows for static Guyan condensation of the discontinuous fields internal to the elements, reducing the number of degrees of freedom, and moreover reducing or eliminating the number of negative eigenvalues and pivots resulting from application of the mixed method.
