= Biconjugate gradient method =

Algorithm for solving systems of linear equations

In mathematics, more specifically in numerical linear algebra, the biconjugate gradient method is an algorithm to solve systems of linear equations

$$A x= b.\,$$

Unlike the conjugate gradient method, this algorithm does not require the matrix $A$ to be self-adjoint, but instead one needs to perform multiplications by the conjugate transpose A^{*}.

== The Algorithm ==
1. Choose initial guess $x_0\,$, two other vectors $x_0^*$ and $b^*\,$ and a preconditioner $M\,$
2. $r_0 \leftarrow b-A\, x_0\,$
3. $r_0^* \leftarrow b^*-x_0^*\, A^*$
4. $p_0 \leftarrow M^{-1} r_0\,$
5. $p_0^* \leftarrow r_0^*M^{-1}\,$
6. for $k=0, 1, \ldots$ do
  1. $\alpha_k \leftarrow {r_k^* M^{-1} r_k \over p_k^* A p_k}\,$
  2. $x_{k+1} \leftarrow x_k + \alpha_k \cdot p_k\,$
  3. $x_{k+1}^* \leftarrow x_k^* + \overline{\alpha_k}\cdot p_k^*\,$
  4. $r_{k+1} \leftarrow r_k - \alpha_k \cdot A p_k\,$
  5. $r_{k+1}^* \leftarrow r_k^*- \overline{\alpha_k} \cdot p_k^*\, A^*$
  6. $\beta_k \leftarrow {r_{k+1}^* M^{-1} r_{k+1} \over r_k^* M^{-1} r_k}\,$
  7. $p_{k+1} \leftarrow M^{-1} r_{k+1} + \beta_k \cdot p_k\,$
  8. $p_{k+1}^* \leftarrow r_{k+1}^*M^{-1} + \overline{\beta_k}\cdot p_k^*\,$

In the above formulation, the computed $r_k\,$ and $r_k^*$ satisfy

$$r_k = b - A x_k,\,$$
$$r_k^* = b^* - x_k^*\, A^*$$

and thus are the respective residuals corresponding to $x_k\,$ and $x_k^*$, as approximate solutions to the systems

$$A x = b,\,$$
$$x^*\, A^* = b^*\,;$$

$x^*$ is the adjoint, and $\overline{\alpha}$ is the complex conjugate.

=== Unpreconditioned version of the algorithm ===
1. Choose initial guess $x_0\,$,
2. $r_0 \leftarrow b-A\, x_0\,$
3. $\hat{r}_0 \leftarrow \hat{b} - \hat{x}_0A^*$
4. $p_0 \leftarrow r_0\,$
5. $\hat{p}_0 \leftarrow \hat{r}_0\,$
6. for $k=0, 1, \ldots$ do
  1. $\alpha_k \leftarrow {\hat{r}_k r_k \over \hat{p}_k A p_k}\,$
  2. $x_{k+1} \leftarrow x_k + \alpha_k \cdot p_k\,$
  3. $\hat{x}_{k+1} \leftarrow \hat{x}_k + \alpha_k \cdot \hat{p}_k\,$
  4. $r_{k+1} \leftarrow r_k - \alpha_k \cdot A p_k\,$
  5. $\hat{r}_{k+1} \leftarrow \hat{r}_k- \alpha_k \cdot \hat{p}_k A^*$
  6. $\beta_k \leftarrow {\hat{r}_{k+1} r_{k+1} \over \hat{r}_k r_k}\,$
  7. $p_{k+1} \leftarrow r_{k+1} + \beta_k \cdot p_k\,$
  8. $\hat{p}_{k+1} \leftarrow \hat{r}_{k+1} + \beta_k \cdot \hat{p}_k\,$

== Discussion ==
The biconjugate gradient method is numerically unstable (compare to the biconjugate gradient stabilized method), but very important from a theoretical point of view. Define the iteration steps by

$$x_k:=x_j+ P_k A^{-1}\left(b - A x_j \right),$$
$$x_k^*:= x_j^*+\left(b^*- x_j^* A \right) P_k A^{-1},$$

where $j<k$ using the related projection

$$P_k:= \mathbf{u}_k \left(\mathbf{v}_k^* A \mathbf{u}_k \right)^{-1} \mathbf{v}_k^* A,$$

with

$$\mathbf{u}_k=\left[u_0, u_1, \dots, u_{k-1} \right],$$
$$\mathbf{v}_k=\left[v_0, v_1, \dots, v_{k-1} \right].$$

These related projections may be iterated themselves as

$$P_{k+1}= P_k+ \left( 1-P_k\right) u_k \otimes {v_k^* A\left(1-P_k \right) \over v_k^* A\left(1-P_k \right) u_k}.$$

A relation to Quasi-Newton methods is given by $P_k= A_k^{-1} A$ and $x_{k+1}= x_k- A_{k+1}^{-1}\left(A x_k -b \right)$, where

$$A_{k+1}^{-1}= A_k^{-1}+ \left( 1-A_k^{-1}A\right) u_k \otimes {v_k^* \left(1-A A_k^{-1} \right) \over v_k^* A\left(1-A_k^{-1}A \right) u_k}.$$

The new directions

$$p_k = \left(1-P_k \right) u_k,$$
$$p_k^* = v_k^* A \left(1- P_k \right) A^{-1}$$

are then orthogonal to the residuals:

$$v_i^* r_k= p_i^* r_k=0,$$
$$r_k^* u_j = r_k^* p_j= 0,$$

which themselves satisfy

$$r_k= A \left( 1- P_k \right) A^{-1} r_j,$$
$$r_k^*= r_j^* \left( 1- P_k \right)$$

where $i,j<k$.

The biconjugate gradient method now makes a special choice and uses the setting

$$u_k = M^{-1} r_k,\,$$
$$v_k^* = r_k^* \, M^{-1}.\,$$

With this particular choice, explicit evaluations of $P_k$ and A^{−1} are avoided, and the algorithm takes the form stated above.

== Properties ==
- If $A= A^*\,$ is self-adjoint, $x_0^*= x_0$ and $b^*=b$, then $r_k= r_k^*$, $p_k= p_k^*$, and the conjugate gradient method produces the same sequence $x_k= x_k^*$ at half the computational cost.
- The sequences produced by the algorithm are biorthogonal, i.e., $p_i^*Ap_j=r_i^*M^{-1}r_j=0$ for $i \neq j$.
- if $P_{j'}\,$ is a polynomial with $\deg\left(P_{j'}\right)+j<k$, then $r_k^*P_{j'}\left(M^{-1}A\right)u_j=0$. The algorithm thus produces projections onto the Krylov subspace.
- if $P_{i'}\,$ is a polynomial with $i+\deg\left(P_{i'}\right)<k$, then $v_i^*P_{i'}\left(AM^{-1}\right)r_k=0$.

== See also ==
- Biconjugate gradient stabilized method (BiCG-Stab)
- Conjugate gradient method (CG)
- Conjugate gradient squared method (CGS)
