= Biconjugate gradient stabilized method =

Concept in mathematics

In numerical linear algebra, the biconjugate gradient stabilized method, often abbreviated as BiCGSTAB, is an iterative method developed by H. A. van der Vorst for the numerical solution of nonsymmetric linear systems. It is a variant of the biconjugate gradient method (BiCG) and has faster and smoother convergence than the original BiCG as well as other variants such as the conjugate gradient squared method (CGS). It is a Krylov subspace method. Unlike the original BiCG method, it doesn't require multiplication by the transpose of the system matrix.

== Algorithmic steps ==
=== Unpreconditioned BiCGSTAB ===
In the following sections, (x,y) = x^{T} y denotes the dot product of vectors. To solve a linear system Ax = b, BiCGSTAB starts with an initial guess x_{0} and proceeds as follows:

1. r_{0} = b − Ax_{0}
2. Choose an arbitrary vector r̂_{0} such that (r̂_{0}, r_{0}) ≠ 0, e.g., r̂_{0} = r_{0}
3. ρ_{0} = (r̂_{0}, r_{0})
4. p_{0} = r_{0}
5. For i = 1, 2, 3, …
  1. v = Ap_{i−1}
  2. α = ρ_{i−1}/(r̂_{0}, v)
  3. h = x_{i−1} + αp_{i−1}
  4. s = r_{i−1} − αv
  5. If h is accurate enough, i.e., if s is small enough, then set x_{i} = h and quit
  6. t = As
  7. ω = (t, s)/(t, t)
  8. x_{i} = h + ωs
  9. r_{i} = s − ωt
  10. If x_{i} is accurate enough, i.e., if r_{i} is small enough, then quit
  11. ρ_{i} = (r̂_{0}, r_{i})
  12. β = (ρ_{i}/ρ_{i−1})(α/ω)
  13. p_{i} = r_{i} + β(p_{i−1} − ωv)

In some cases, choosing the vector r̂_{0} randomly improves numerical stability.

=== Preconditioned BiCGSTAB ===
Preconditioners are usually used to accelerate convergence of iterative methods. To solve a linear system Ax = b with a preconditioner K = K_{1}K_{2} ≈ A, preconditioned BiCGSTAB starts with an initial guess x_{0} and proceeds as follows:

1. r_{0} = b − Ax_{0}
2. Choose an arbitrary vector r̂_{0} such that (r̂_{0}, r_{0}) ≠ 0, e.g., r̂_{0} = r_{0}
3. ρ_{0} = (r̂_{0}, r_{0})
4. p_{0} = r_{0}
5. For i = 1, 2, 3, …
  1. y = K −1
    2 K −1
    1 p_{i−1}
  2. v = Ay
  3. α = ρ_{i−1}/(r̂_{0}, v)
  4. h = x_{i−1} + αy
  5. s = r_{i−1} − αv
  6. If h is accurate enough then x_{i} = h and quit
  7. z = K −1
    2 K −1
    1 s
  8. t = Az
  9. ω = (K −1
    1 t, K −1
    1 s)/(K −1
    1 t, K −1
    1 t)
  10. x_{i} = h + ωz
  11. r_{i} = s − ωt
  12. If x_{i} is accurate enough then quit
  13. ρ_{i} = (r̂_{0}, r_{i})
  14. β = (ρ_{i}/ρ_{i−1})(α/ω)
  15. p_{i} = r_{i} + β(p_{i−1} − ωv)

This formulation is equivalent to applying unpreconditioned BiCGSTAB to the explicitly preconditioned system

Ãx̃ = b̃

with Ã = K −1
1 AK −1
2 , x̃ = K_{2}x and b̃ = K −1
1 b. In other words, both left- and right-preconditioning are possible with this formulation.

== Derivation ==
=== BiCG in polynomial form ===
In BiCG, the search directions p_{i} and p̂_{i} and the residuals r_{i} and r̂_{i} are updated using the following recurrence relations:

p_{i} = r_{i−1} + β_{i}p_{i−1},
p̂_{i} = r̂_{i−1} + β_{i}p̂_{i−1},
r_{i} = r_{i−1} − α_{i}Ap_{i},
r̂_{i} = r̂_{i−1} − α_{i}A^{T}p̂_{i}.

The constants α_{i} and β_{i} are chosen to be

α_{i} = ρ_{i}/(p̂_{i}, Ap_{i}),
β_{i} = ρ_{i}/ρ_{i−1}

where ρ_{i} = (r̂_{i−1}, r_{i−1}) so that the residuals and the search directions satisfy biorthogonality and biconjugacy, respectively, i.e., for i ≠ j,

(r̂_{i}, r_{j}) = 0,
(p̂_{i}, Ap_{j}) = 0.

It is straightforward to show that

r_{i} = P_{i}(A)r_{0},
r̂_{i} = P_{i}(A^{T})r̂_{0},
p_{i+1} = T_{i}(A)r_{0},
p̂_{i+1} = T_{i}(A^{T})r̂_{0}

where P_{i}(A) and T_{i}(A) are ith-degree polynomials in A. These polynomials satisfy the following recurrence relations:

P_{i}(A) = P_{i−1}(A) − α_{i}AT_{i−1}(A),
T_{i}(A) = P_{i}(A) + β_{i+1}T_{i−1}(A).

=== Derivation of BiCGSTAB from BiCG ===
It is unnecessary to explicitly keep track of the residuals and search directions of BiCG. In other words, the BiCG iterations can be performed implicitly. In BiCGSTAB, one wishes to have recurrence relations for

r̃_{i} = Q_{i}(A)P_{i}(A)r_{0}

where Q_{i}(A) = (I − ω_{1}A)(I − ω_{2}A)⋯(I − ω_{i}A) with suitable constants ω_{j} instead of r_{i} = P_{i}(A)r_{0} in the hope that Q_{i}(A) will enable faster and smoother convergence in r̃_{i} than r_{i}.

It follows from the recurrence relations for P_{i}(A) and T_{i}(A) and the definition of Q_{i}(A) that

Q_{i}(A)P_{i}(A)r_{0} = (I − ω_{i}A)(Q_{i−1}(A)P_{i−1}(A)r_{0} − α_{i}AQ_{i−1}(A)T_{i−1}(A)r_{0}),

which entails the necessity of a recurrence relation for Q_{i}(A)T_{i}(A)r_{0}. This can also be derived from the BiCG relations:

Q_{i}(A)T_{i}(A)r_{0} = Q_{i}(A)P_{i}(A)r_{0} + β_{i+1}(I − ω_{i}A)Q_{i−1}(A)T_{i−1}(A)r_{0}.

Similarly to defining r̃_{i}, BiCGSTAB defines

p̃_{i+1} = Q_{i}(A)T_{i}(A)r_{0}.

Written in vector form, the recurrence relations for p̃_{i} and r̃_{i} are

p̃_{i} = r̃_{i−1} + β_{i}(I − ω_{i−1}A)p̃_{i−1},
r̃_{i} = (I − ω_{i}A)(r̃_{i−1} − α_{i}Ap̃_{i}).

To derive a recurrence relation for x_{i}, define

s_{i} = r̃_{i−1} − α_{i}Ap̃_{i}.

The recurrence relation for r̃_{i} can then be written as

r̃_{i} = r̃_{i−1} − α_{i}Ap̃_{i} − ω_{i}As_{i},

which corresponds to

x_{i} = x_{i−1} + α_{i}p̃_{i} + ω_{i}s_{i}.

=== Determination of BiCGSTAB constants ===
Now it remains to determine the BiCG constants α_{i} and β_{i} and choose a suitable ω_{i}.

In BiCG, β_{i} = ρ_{i}/ρ_{i−1} with

ρ_{i} = (r̂_{i−1}, r_{i−1}) = (P_{i−1}(A^{T})r̂_{0}, P_{i−1}(A)r_{0}).

Since BiCGSTAB does not explicitly keep track of r̂_{i} or r_{i}, ρ_{i} is not immediately computable from this formula. However, it can be related to the scalar

ρ̃_{i} = (Q_{i−1}(A^{T})r̂_{0}, P_{i−1}(A)r_{0}) = (r̂_{0}, Q_{i−1}(A)P_{i−1}(A)r_{0}) = (r̂_{0}, r_{i−1}).

Due to biorthogonality, r_{i−1} = P_{i−1}(A)r_{0} is orthogonal to U_{i−2}(A^{T})r̂_{0} where U_{i−2}(A^{T}) is any polynomial of degree i − 2 in A^{T}. Hence, only the highest-order terms of P_{i−1}(A^{T}) and Q_{i−1}(A^{T}) matter in the dot products (P_{i−1}(A^{T})r̂_{0}, P_{i−1}(A)r_{0}) and (Q_{i−1}(A^{T})r̂_{0}, P_{i−1}(A)r_{0}). The leading coefficients of P_{i−1}(A^{T}) and Q_{i−1}(A^{T}) are (−1)^{i−1}α_{1}α_{2}⋯α_{i−1} and (−1)^{i−1}ω_{1}ω_{2}⋯ω_{i−1}, respectively. It follows that

ρ_{i} = (α_{1}/ω_{1})(α_{2}/ω_{2})⋯(α_{i−1}/ω_{i−1})ρ̃_{i},

and thus

β_{i} = ρ_{i}/ρ_{i−1} = (ρ̃_{i}/ρ̃_{i−1})(α_{i−1}/ω_{i−1}).

A simple formula for α_{i} can be similarly derived. In BiCG,

α_{i} = ρ_{i}/(p̂_{i}, Ap_{i}) = (P_{i−1}(A^{T})r̂_{0}, P_{i−1}(A)r_{0})/(T_{i−1}(A^{T})r̂_{0}, AT_{i−1}(A)r_{0}).

Similarly to the case above, only the highest-order terms of P_{i−1}(A^{T}) and T_{i−1}(A^{T}) matter in the dot products thanks to biorthogonality and biconjugacy. It happens that P_{i−1}(A^{T}) and T_{i−1}(A^{T}) have the same leading coefficient. Thus, they can be replaced simultaneously with Q_{i−1}(A^{T}) in the formula, which leads to

α_{i} = (Q_{i−1}(A^{T})r̂_{0}, P_{i−1}(A)r_{0})/(Q_{i−1}(A^{T})r̂_{0}, AT_{i−1}(A)r_{0}) = ρ̃_{i}/(r̂_{0}, AQ_{i−1}(A)T_{i−1}(A)r_{0}) = ρ̃_{i}/(r̂_{0}, Ap̃_{i}).

Finally, BiCGSTAB selects ω_{i} to minimize r̃_{i} = (I − ω_{i}A)s_{i} in 2-norm as a function of ω_{i}. This is achieved when

((I − ω_{i}A)s_{i}, As_{i}) = 0,

giving the optimal value

ω_{i} = (As_{i}, s_{i})/(As_{i}, As_{i}).

== Generalization ==
BiCGSTAB can be viewed as a combination of BiCG and GMRES where each BiCG step is followed by a GMRES(1) (i.e., GMRES restarted at each step) step to repair the irregular convergence behavior of CGS, as an improvement of which BiCGSTAB was developed. However, due to the use of degree-one minimum residual polynomials, such repair may not be effective if the matrix A has large complex eigenpairs. In such cases, BiCGSTAB is likely to stagnate, as confirmed by numerical experiments.

One may expect that higher-degree minimum residual polynomials may better handle this situation. This gives rise to algorithms including BiCGSTAB2 and the more general BiCGSTAB(l). In BiCGSTAB(l), a GMRES(l) step follows every l BiCG steps. BiCGSTAB2 is equivalent to BiCGSTAB(l) with l = 2.

== See also ==
- Biconjugate gradient method
- Conjugate gradient squared method
- Conjugate gradient method
