= Orthonormal function system =

Mathematical Function

An orthonormal function system (ONS) is an orthonormal basis in a vector space of functions.
