= Ladyzhenskaya–Babuška–Brezzi condition =

Mathematical term

In numerical partial differential equations, the Ladyzhenskaya–Babuška–Brezzi (LBB) condition is a sufficient condition for a saddle point problem to have a unique solution that depends continuously on the input data. Saddle point problems arise in the discretization of Stokes flow and in the mixed finite element discretization of Poisson's equation. For positive-definite problems, like the unmixed formulation of the Poisson equation, most discretization schemes will converge to the true solution in the limit as the mesh is refined. For saddle point problems, however, many discretizations are unstable, giving rise to artifacts such as spurious oscillations. The LBB condition gives criteria for when a discretization of a saddle point problem is stable.

The condition is variously referred to as the LBB condition, the Babuška–Brezzi condition, or the "inf-sup" condition.

== Saddle point problems ==
The abstract form of a saddle point problem can be expressed in terms of Hilbert spaces and bilinear forms. Let $V$ and $Q$ be Hilbert spaces, and let $a : V \times V \to \mathbb{R}$, $b : V \times Q \to \mathbb{R}$ be bilinear forms. Let $f \in V^*$, $g \in Q^*$ where $V^*$, $Q^*$ are the dual spaces. The saddle-point problem for the pair $a$, $b$ is to find a pair of fields $u$ in $V$, $p$ in $Q$ such that, for all $v$ in $V$ and $q$ in $Q$,

$$\begin{align}a(u, v) + b(v, p) & = \langle f, v\rangle \\
b(u, q) & = \langle g, q\rangle.\end{align}$$

For example, for the Stokes equations on a $d$-dimensional domain $\Omega$, the fields are the velocity $u$ and pressure $p$, which live in respectively the Sobolev space $H^1(\Omega)^d$ and the Lebesgue space $L^2(\Omega)$. The bilinear forms for this problem are

$$\begin{align}a(u, v) & = \int_\Omega \mu\nabla u : \nabla v\,dx \\
b(u, q) & = \int_\Omega (\nabla\cdot u)q\,dx,\end{align}$$

where $\mu$ is the viscosity.

Another example is the mixed Laplace equation (in this context also sometimes called the Darcy equations) where the fields are again the velocity $u$ and pressure $p$, which live in the spaces $H_\text{div}(\Omega)^d$ and $L^2(\Omega)$, respectively. Here, the bilinear forms for the problem are

$$\begin{align}a(u, v) & = \int_\Omega u \cdot K^{-1} v\,dx \\
b(u, q) & = \int_\Omega (\nabla\cdot u)q\,dx,\end{align}$$

where $K^{-1}$ is the inverse of the permeability tensor.

== Statement of the theorem ==
Suppose that $a$ and $b$ are both continuous bilinear forms, and moreover that $a$ is coercive on the kernel of $b$:

$$a(v, v) \ge \alpha\|v\|_V^2$$

for some $\alpha>0$, for all $v$ such that $b(v, q) = 0$ for all $q \in Q$. If $b$ satisfies the inf–sup or Ladyzhenskaya–Babuška–Brezzi condition

$$\sup_{v \in V, v\neq 0}\frac{b(v, q)}{\|v\|_V} \ge \beta\|q\|_Q$$

for all $q$ and for some $\beta>0$, then there exists a unique solution $u, p$ of the saddle-point problem. Moreover, there exists a constant $C$ such that

$$\|u\|_V + \|p\|_Q \le C(\|f\|_{V^*} + \|g\|_{Q^*}).$$

The alternative name of the condition, the "inf-sup" condition, comes from the fact that by dividing by $\|q\|_Q$, one arrives at the statement

$$\sup_{v \in V, v\neq 0}\frac{b(v, q)}{\|v\|_V \|q\|_Q} \ge \beta.$$

Since this has to hold for all $q \in Q$ and since the right hand side does not depend on $q$, we can take the infimum over all $q$ on the left side and can rewrite the condition equivalently as

$$\inf_{q\in Q, q\neq 0} \sup_{v \in V, v\neq 0}\frac{b(v, q)}{\|v\|_V \|q\|_Q} \ge \beta.$$

== Connection to infinite-dimensional optimization problems ==
Saddle point problems such as those shown above are frequently associated with infinite-dimensional optimization problems with constraints. For example, the Stokes equations result from minimizing the dissipation

$$I(u) = \int_\Omega \left( \frac 12 \mu |\nabla u|^2 - f \cdot u \right)$$

subject to the incompressibility constraint

$$\nabla \cdot u = 0.$$

Using the usual approach to constrained optimization problems, one can form a Lagrangian

$$L(u,\lambda) = I(u) - \left( \lambda, \nabla \cdot u\right)  = \int_\Omega \left( \frac 12 \mu |\nabla u|^2 - f \cdot u - \lambda (\nabla \cdot u) \right).$$

The optimality conditions (Karush-Kuhn-Tucker conditions) -- that is the first order necessary conditions—that correspond to this problem are then by variation of $L(u, \lambda)$ with regard to $u$

$$\int_\Omega  \left( \mu \nabla u : \nabla v - f \cdot v - \lambda (\nabla \cdot v) \right) = 0 \qquad \forall v \in H^1(\Omega)^d,$$

and by variation of $L(u, \lambda)$ with regard to $\lambda$:

$$- \int_\Omega  \left( q (\nabla \cdot u) \right) = 0 \qquad \forall q \in L_2(\Omega)^d,$$

This is exactly the variational form of the Stokes equations shown above with

$$a(u,v) := \int_\Omega  \left( \mu \nabla u : \nabla v \right),$$
$$b(\lambda,v) := \int_\Omega  \lambda (\nabla \cdot v).$$

The inf-sup conditions can in this context then be understood as the infinite-dimensional equivalent of the constraint qualification (specifically, the LICQ) conditions necessary to guarantee that a minimizer of the constrained optimization problem also satisfies the first-order necessary conditions represented by the saddle point problem shown previously. In this context, the inf-sup conditions can be interpreted as saying that relative to the size of the space $V$ of state variables $u$, the number of constraints (as represented by the size of the space $Q$ of Lagrange multipliers $\lambda$) must be sufficiently small. Alternatively, it can be seen as requiring that the size of the space $V$ of state variables $u$ must be sufficiently large compared to the size of the space $Q$ of Lagrange multipliers $\lambda$.
