= Conjugate gradient squared method =

Algorithm for solving matrix-vector equations

In numerical linear algebra, the conjugate gradient squared method (CGS) is an iterative algorithm for solving systems of linear equations of the form $A{\bold x} = {\bold b}$, particularly in cases where computing the transpose $A^T$ is impractical. The CGS method was developed as an improvement to the biconjugate gradient method.

== Background ==
A system of linear equations $A{\bold x} = {\bold b}$ consists of a known matrix $A$ and a known vector ${\bold b}$. To solve the system is to find the value of the unknown vector ${\bold x}$. A direct method for solving a system of linear equations is to take the inverse of the matrix $A$, then calculate $\bold x = A^{-1}\bold b$. However, computing the inverse is computationally expensive. Hence, iterative methods are commonly used. Iterative methods begin with a guess $\bold x^{(0)}$, and on each iteration the guess is improved. Once the difference between successive guesses is sufficiently small, the method has converged to a solution.

As with the conjugate gradient method, biconjugate gradient method, and similar iterative methods for solving systems of linear equations, the CGS method can be used to find solutions to multi-variable optimisation problems, such as power-flow analysis, hyperparameter optimisation, and facial recognition.

== Algorithm ==
The algorithm is as follows:

1. Choose an initial guess ${\bold x}^{(0)}$
2. Compute the residual ${\bold r}^{(0)} = {\bold b} - A{\bold x}^{(0)}$
3. Choose $\tilde {\bold r} = {\bold r}^{(0)}$
4. For $i = 1, 2, 3, \dots$ do:
  1. $\rho^{(i-1)} = \tilde {\bold r}^{T}{\bold r}^{(i-1)}$
  2. If $\rho^{(i-1)} = 0$, the method fails.
  3. If $i=1$:
    1. ${\bold p}^{(1)} = {\bold u}^{(1)} = {\bold r}^{(0)}$
  4. Else:
    1. $\beta^{(i-1)} = \rho^{(i-1)}/\rho^{(i-2)}$
    2. ${\bold u}^{(i)} = {\bold r}^{(i-1)} + \beta_{i-1}{\bold q}^{(i-1)}$
    3. ${\bold p}^{(i)} = {\bold u}^{(i)} + \beta^{(i-1)}({\bold q}^{(i-1)} + \beta^{(i-1)}{\bold p}^{(i-1)})$
  5. Solve $M\hat {\bold p}={\bold p}^{(i)}$, where $M$ is a pre-conditioner.
  6. $\hat {\bold v} = A\hat {\bold p}$
  7. $\alpha^{(i)} = \rho^{(i-1)} / \tilde {\bold r}^T \hat {\bold v}$
  8. ${\bold q}^{(i)} = {\bold u}^{(i)} - \alpha^{(i)}\hat {\bold v}$
  9. Solve $M\hat {\bold u} = {\bold u}^{(i)} + {\bold q}^{(i)}$
  10. ${\bold x}^{(i)} = {\bold x}^{(i-1)} + \alpha^{(i)} \hat {\bold u}$
  11. $\hat {\bold q} = A\hat {\bold u}$
  12. ${\bold r}^{(i)} = {\bold r}^{(i-1)} - \alpha^{(i)}\hat {\bold q}$
  13. Check for convergence: if there is convergence, end the loop and return the result

== See also ==
- Biconjugate gradient method
- Biconjugate gradient stabilized method
- Generalized minimal residual method
