= Krylov subspace =

Linear subspace generated from a vector acted on by a power series of a matrix

In linear algebra, the order-r Krylov subspace generated by an n-by-n matrix A and a vector b of dimension n is the linear subspace spanned by the images of b under the first r powers of A (starting from $A^0=I$), that is,

$$\mathcal{K}_r(A,b) = \operatorname{span} \, \{ b, Ab, A^2b, \ldots, A^{r-1}b \}.$$

== Background ==
The concept is named after Russian applied mathematician and naval engineer Aleksey Krylov, who published a paper about the concept in 1931.

== Properties ==
- $\mathcal{K}_r(A,b), A\,\mathcal{K}_r(A,b)\subset \mathcal{K}_{r+1}(A,b)$.
- Let $r_0 = \operatorname{dim} \operatorname{span} \, \{ b, Ab, A^2b, \ldots \}$. Then $\{ b, Ab, A^2b, \ldots, A^{r-1}b \}$ are linearly independent unless $r>r_0$, $\mathcal{K}_r(A,b) \subset \mathcal{K}_{r_0}(A,b)$ for all $r$, and $\operatorname{dim} \mathcal{K}_{r_0}(A,b) = r_0$. So $r_0$ is the maximal dimension of the Krylov subspaces $\mathcal{K}_r(A,b)$.
- The maximal dimension satisfies $r_0\leq 1 + \operatorname{rank} A$ and $r_0 \leq n$.
- Consider $\dim \operatorname{span} \, \{ I, A, A^2, \ldots \} = \deg\,p(A)$, where $p(A)$ is the minimal polynomial of $A$. We have $r_0\leq \deg\,p(A)$. Moreover, for any $A$, there exists a $b$ for which this bound is tight, i.e. $r_0 = \deg\,p(A)$.
- $\mathcal{K}_r(A,b)$ is a cyclic submodule generated by $b$ of the torsion $k[x]$-module $(k^n)^A$, where $k^n$ is the linear space on $k$.
- $k^n$ can be decomposed as the direct sum of Krylov subspaces.

== Use ==
Krylov subspaces are used in algorithms for finding approximate solutions to high-dimensional linear algebra problems. Many linear dynamical system tests in control theory, especially those related to controllability and observability, involve checking the rank of the Krylov subspace. These tests are equivalent to finding the span of the Gramians associated with the system/output maps so the uncontrollable and unobservable subspaces are simply the orthogonal complement to the Krylov subspace.

Modern iterative methods such as Arnoldi iteration can be used for finding one (or a few) eigenvalues of large sparse matrices or solving large systems of linear equations. They try to avoid matrix-matrix operations, but rather multiply vectors by the matrix and work with the resulting vectors. Starting with a vector $b$, one computes $A b$, then one multiplies that vector by $A$ to find $A^2 b$ and so on. All algorithms that work this way are referred to as Krylov subspace methods; they are among the most successful methods currently available in numerical linear algebra. These methods can be used in situations where there is an algorithm to compute the matrix-vector multiplication without there being an explicit representation of $A$, giving rise to matrix-free methods.

== Issues ==
Because the vectors usually soon become almost linearly dependent due to the properties of power iteration, methods relying on Krylov subspace frequently involve some orthogonalization scheme, such as Lanczos iteration for Hermitian matrices or Arnoldi iteration for more general matrices.

== Existing methods ==
The best known Krylov subspace methods are the Conjugate gradient, IDR(s) (Induced dimension reduction), GMRES (generalized minimum residual), BiCGSTAB (biconjugate gradient stabilized), QMR (quasi minimal residual), TFQMR (transpose-free QMR) and MINRES (minimal residual method).

== See also ==
- Iterative method, which has a section on Krylov subspace methods
