= Jan Mandel =

Czech-American mathematician

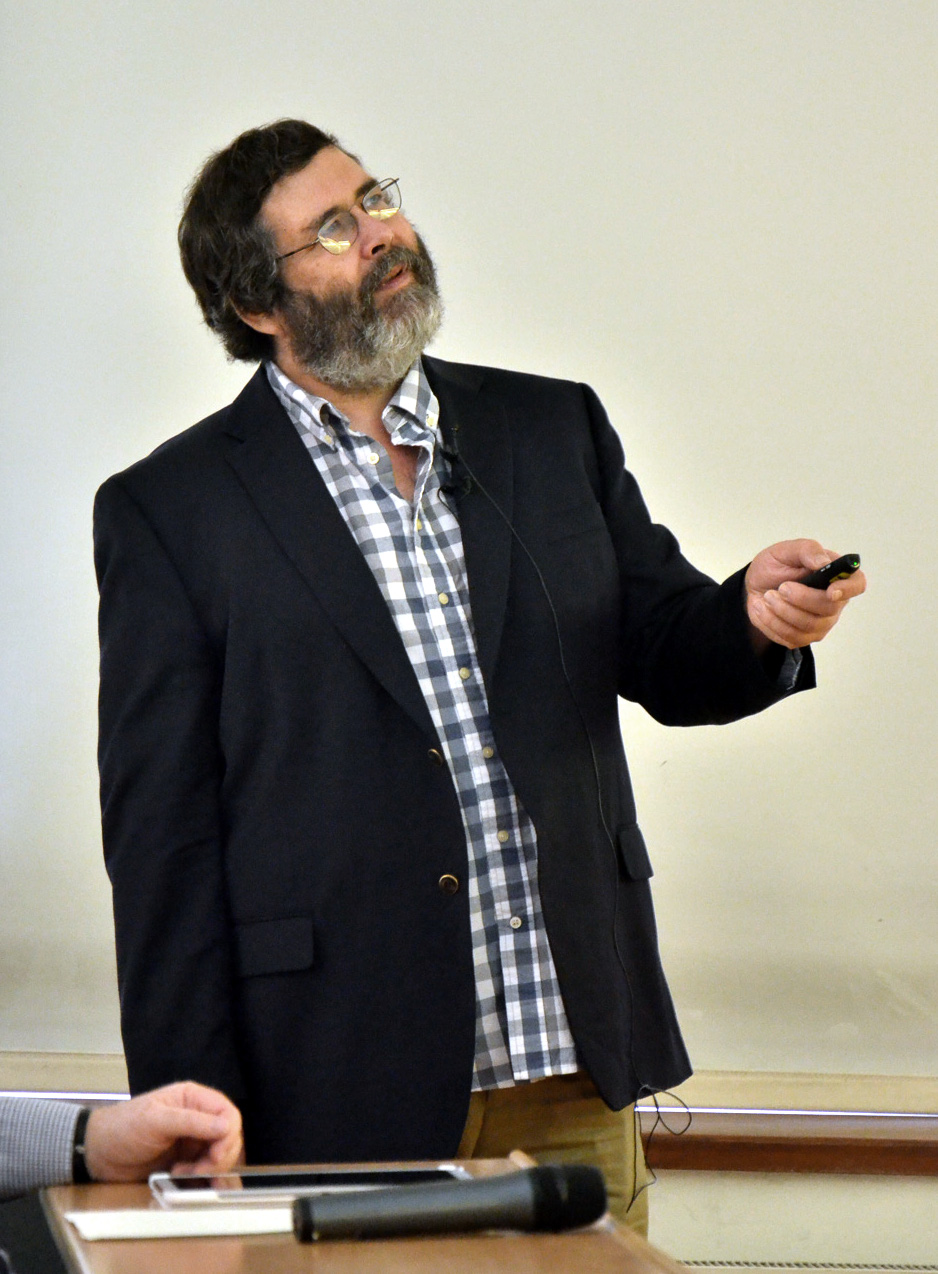
- Jan Mandel at the Prague Computer Science seminar, May 2015.
- Occupation: Mathematician
- Known for: Balancing domain decomposition, WRF-Fire

Jan Mandel is a Czech-American mathematician. He received his PhD from the faculty of mathematics and physics, Charles University in Prague and was a senior research scientist there. Since 1986, he is professor of mathematics at the University of Colorado Denver. Since 2013, he is senior scientist at the Institute of Computer Science of the Czech Academy of Sciences.

He has worked in the field of multigrid methods and domain decomposition methods. He developed the balancing domain decomposition method and, with coauthors, published the convergence proofs of the FETI, FETI-DP, and BDDC methods, and the proof of the equivalence of the FETI-DP and the BDDC methods. He has been involved in the field of dynamic data driven application systems and data assimilation with applications in wildfire and epidemic modeling. He has contributed to the WRF-Fire software.

== Honors ==
- Olof B. Widlund Prize in Domain Decomposition Methods (2025)
