= Numerical methods for partial differential equations =

Branch of numerical analysis

Numerical methods for partial differential equations is the branch of numerical analysis that studies the numerical solution of partial differential equations (PDEs).

In principle, specialized methods for hyperbolic, parabolic or elliptic partial differential equations exist.

== Overview of methods ==
=== Finite difference method ===
In this method, functions are represented by their values at certain grid points and derivatives are approximated through differences in these values.

=== Method of lines ===
The method of lines (MOL, NMOL, NUMOL) is a technique for solving partial differential equations (PDEs) in which all dimensions except one are discretized. MOL allows standard, general-purpose methods and software, developed for the numerical integration of ordinary differential equations (ODEs) and differential algebraic equations (DAEs), to be used. A large number of integration routines have been developed over the years in many different programming languages, and some have been published as open source resources.

The method of lines most often refers to the construction or analysis of numerical methods for partial differential equations that proceeds by first discretizing the spatial derivatives only and leaving the time variable continuous. This leads to a system of ordinary differential equations to which a numerical method for initial value ordinary equations can be applied. The method of lines in this context dates back to at least the early 1960s.

=== Finite element method ===
The finite element method (FEM) is a numerical technique for finding approximate solutions to boundary value problems for differential equations. It uses variational methods (the calculus of variations) to minimize an error function and produce a stable solution. Analogous to the idea that connecting many tiny straight lines can approximate a larger circle, FEM encompasses all the methods for connecting many simple element equations over many small subdomains, named finite elements, to approximate a more complex equation over a larger domain.

=== Gradient discretization method ===
The gradient discretization method (GDM) is a numerical technique that encompasses a few standard or recent methods. It is based on the separate approximation of a function and of its gradient. Core properties allow the convergence of the method for a series of linear and nonlinear problems, and therefore all the methods that enter the GDM framework (conforming and nonconforming finite element, mixed finite element, mimetic finite difference...) inherit these convergence properties.

=== Finite volume method ===
The finite-volume method is a numerical technique for representing and evaluating partial differential equations in the form of algebraic equations [LeVeque, 2002; Toro, 1999]. Similar to the finite difference method or finite element method, values are calculated at discrete places on a meshed geometry. "Finite volume" refers to the small volume surrounding each node point on a mesh. In the finite volume method, volume integrals in a partial differential equation that contain a divergence term are converted to surface integrals, using the divergence theorem. These terms are then evaluated as fluxes at the surfaces of each finite volume. Because the flux entering a given volume is identical to that leaving the adjacent volume, these methods are conservative. Another advantage of the finite volume method is that it is easily formulated to allow for unstructured meshes. The method is used in many computational fluid dynamics packages.

=== Spectral method ===
Spectral methods are techniques used in applied mathematics and scientific computing to numerically solve certain differential equations, often involving the use of the fast Fourier transform. The idea is to write the solution of the differential equation as a sum of certain "basis functions" (for example, as a Fourier series, which is a sum of sinusoids) and then to choose the coefficients in the sum that best satisfy the differential equation.

Spectral methods and finite element methods are closely related and built on the same ideas; the main difference between them is that spectral methods use basis functions that are nonzero over the whole domain, while finite element methods use basis functions that are nonzero only on small subdomains. In other words, spectral methods take on a global approach while finite element methods use a local approach. Partially for this reason, spectral methods have excellent error properties, with the so-called "exponential convergence" being the fastest possible, when the solution is smooth. However, there are no known three-dimensional single domain spectral shock capturing results. In the finite element community, a method where the degree of the elements is very high or increases as the grid parameter h decreases to zero is sometimes called a spectral element method.

=== Meshfree methods ===
Meshfree methods do not require a mesh connecting the data points of the simulation domain. Meshfree methods enable the simulation of some otherwise difficult types of problems, at the cost of extra computing time and programming effort.

=== Domain decomposition methods ===
Domain decomposition methods solve a boundary value problem by splitting it into smaller boundary value problems on subdomains and iterating to coordinate the solution between adjacent subdomains. A coarse problem with one or few unknowns per subdomain is used to further coordinate the solution between the subdomains globally. The problems on the subdomains are independent, which makes domain decomposition methods suitable for parallel computing. Domain decomposition methods are typically used as preconditioners for Krylov space iterative methods, such as the conjugate gradient method or GMRES.

In overlapping domain decomposition methods, the subdomains overlap by more than the interface. Overlapping domain decomposition methods include the Schwarz alternating method and the additive Schwarz method. Many domain decomposition methods can be written and analyzed as a special case of the abstract additive Schwarz method.

In non-overlapping methods, the subdomains intersect only on their interface. In primal methods, such as Balancing domain decomposition and BDDC, the continuity of the solution across subdomain interface is enforced by representing the value of the solution on all neighboring subdomains by the same unknown. In dual methods, such as FETI, the continuity of the solution across the subdomain interface is enforced by Lagrange multipliers. The FETI-DP method is hybrid between a dual and a primal method.

Non-overlapping domain decomposition methods are also called iterative substructuring methods.

Mortar methods are discretization methods for partial differential equations, which use separate discretization on nonoverlapping subdomains. The meshes on the subdomains do not match on the interface, and the equality of the solution is enforced by Lagrange multipliers, judiciously chosen to preserve the accuracy of the solution. In the engineering practice in the finite element method, continuity of solutions between non-matching subdomains is implemented by multiple-point constraints.

Finite element simulations of moderate size models require solving linear systems with millions of unknowns. Several hours per time step is an average sequential run time, therefore, parallel computing is a necessity. Domain decomposition methods embody large potential for a parallelization of the finite element methods, and serve a basis for distributed, parallel computations.

=== Multigrid methods ===
Multigrid (MG) methods in numerical analysis are a group of algorithms for solving differential equations using a hierarchy of discretizations. They are an example of a class of techniques called multiresolution methods, very useful in (but not limited to) problems exhibiting multiple scales of behavior. For example, many basic relaxation methods exhibit different rates of convergence for short- and long-wavelength components, suggesting these different scales be treated differently, as in a Fourier analysis approach to multigrid. MG methods can be used as solvers as well as preconditioners.

The main idea of multigrid is to accelerate the convergence of a basic iterative method by global correction from time to time, accomplished by solving a coarse problem. This principle is similar to interpolation between coarser and finer grids. The typical application for multigrid is in the numerical solution of elliptic partial differential equations in two or more dimensions.

Multigrid methods can be applied in combination with any of the common discretization techniques. For example, the finite element method may be recast as a multigrid method. In these cases, multigrid methods are among the fastest solution techniques known today. In contrast to other methods, multigrid methods are general in that they can treat arbitrary regions and boundary conditions. They do not depend on the separability of the equations or other special properties of the equation. They have also been widely used for more-complicated non-symmetric and nonlinear systems of equations, like the Lamé system of elasticity or the Navier–Stokes equations.

== Comparison ==
The finite difference method is often regarded as the simplest method to learn and use. The finite element and finite volume methods are widely used in engineering and in computational fluid dynamics, and are well suited to problems in complicated geometries. Spectral methods are generally the most accurate, provided that the solutions are sufficiently smooth.

== See also ==
- List of numerical analysis topics § Numerical methods for partial differential equations
- Numerical methods for ordinary differential equations
