= Vyacheslav Lebedev (mathematician) =

Russian mathematician (1930–2010)

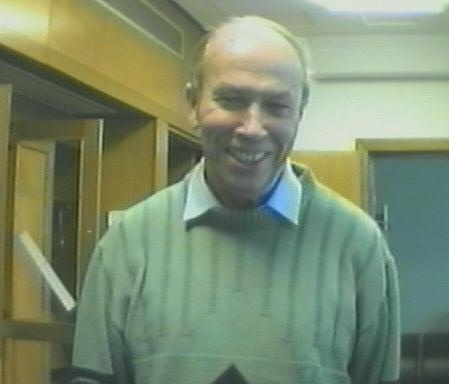
- Prof. Vyacheslav Ivanovich Lebedev
- Born: Vyacheslav Ivanovich Lebedev; January 27, 1930; Kostroma, Russia
- Died: March 22, 2010 (aged 80); Moscow, Russia
- Occupation: Mathematician
- Known for: Lebedev quadrature, Poincaré–Steklov operator

Vyacheslav Ivanovich Lebedev (Russian: Вячеслав Иванович Лебедев) (January 27, 1930 – March 22, 2010) was a Soviet and Russian mathematician, known for his work on numerical analysis.

== Career ==
Lebedev was a Ph.D. student of Sobolev. He worked at the Kurchatov Institute and Soviet/Russian Academy of Sciences, and taught students at the Moscow State University and Moscow Institute of Physics and Technology. He authored over a hundred papers and several books, most noticeably "Numerical methods in the theory of neutron transport" jointly with Gury Marchuk and "Functional Analysis in Computational Mathematics", based on his lectures. He graduated over 15 Ph.D. students. Lebedev quadrature has become one of the popular methods of integration on a sphere.

=== Areas of expertise ===
He worked in many areas of computational and applied mathematics, ranging from software development for nuclear reactors modeling to approximation by polynomials, from quadrature on a sphere to numerical solution of stiff equations, for which he developed explicit Chebyshev methods called DUMKA, systems of PDEs, from domain decomposition and Poincaré–Steklov operators to finite difference methods, from iterative solvers to parallel computing. He even contributed to finding the roots of a cubic equation.

== Awards ==
He was a recipient of the Soviet State Award for developing mathematical methods of particle transport theory in 1987 and Chebyshev Gold medal (Russian: ru:Золотая медаль имени П. Л. Чебышева) in 2002–03.

== Notes ==
- http://www.netlib.org/na-digest-html/10/v10n13.html#1 Vyacheslav Ivanovich Lebedev, January 27, 1930 – March 22, 2010
