= Olof B. Widlund =

Swedish-American mathematician

Olof Widlund
- Born: 1938 (age 87–88)
- Spouse: Nadine Taub

Academic background
- Education: Uppsala University
- Thesis: On the Stability of Parabolic Difference Schemes (1966)
- Doctoral advisor: Heinz-Otto Kreiss

Academic work
- Institutions: New York University
- Doctoral students: Daniel B. Szyld

Olof B. Widlund (born 1938), is a Swedish-American mathematician. He is best known for his work in numerical analysis, in particular his leading role in and fundamental contributions to domain decomposition methods. He received his Ph.D. at Uppsala University in 1966 and is professor of computer science at the Courant Institute of New York University.

== Publications ==
- Widlund, Olof; Toselli, Andrea (2005). Domain Decomposition Methods - Algorithms and Theory. Springer Series in Computational Mathematics. Vol. 34. Berlin Heidelberg: Springer-Verlag. doi:10.1007/b137868. ISBN 978-3-540-20696-5.

== Recognition ==
- He was included in the 2019 class of fellows of the American Mathematical Society "for contributions to numerical analysis of domain decompositions within computational mathematics and for incubation through his writing and mentorship of a broad international, creative community of practice applied to highly resolved systems simulations".
- The Olof B. Widlund Prize is named in his honor.

=== Olof B. Widlund Prize ===
The Olof B. Widlund Prize (formally, the Olof B. Widlund Prize for Excellence in Domain Decomposition Methods) is an award in numerical analysis given in the Domain Decomposition Methods (DDM) community. According to ddm.org, it is a prize for an established scientist recognizing contributions to domain decomposition methods (including theory, algorithms, scalable implementation, applications, and community service). The awardee gives a plenary lecture at the next ddm.org conference and receives a certificate and a cash award of €2500.

Recipients have been:

- 2022: Maksymilian Dryja (University of Warsaw).
- 2024: Charbel Farhat (Stanford University).
- 2025: Jan Mandel (University of Colorado).

== History ==
According to ddm.org, the prize was established by the Scientific Committee of ddm.org at DD26 (2020) and awarded for the first time at DD27 (Prague, 2022).
