= WFDS =

WFDS may refer to:

- WFDS (FM), a defunct radio station (88.1 FM) formerly licensed to serve Pennsville, New Jersey, United States
- WIYY, a Baltimore, Maryland radio station that used the call sign WFDS from 1958 to 1960
- Wells Fargo Dealer Services (WFDS), an automotive financing division of Wells Fargo
- Wildland-Urban Fire Dynamics Simulator (WFDS), a wildfire modeling extension integrated into the Fire Dynamics Simulator software
- Windsor Forks District School, an elementary school in Nova Scotia governed by the Annapolis Valley Regional School Board
