= Alina Chertock =

Mathematician

- Born: Soviet Union
- Education: Moscow State University (M.S.), Tel Aviv University (Ph.D.)
- Known for: Numerical methods for partial differential equations
- Awards: Fellow of the Society for Industrial and Applied Mathematics (2023)
- Scientific career
- Fields: Applied Mathematics
- Institutions: North Carolina State University
- Thesis: Strict stability of high-order compact implicit finite-difference schemes: the role of boundary conditions for hyperbolic PDEs (1999)
- Doctoral advisor: Saul Abarbanel

Alina Chertock is a mathematician whose research involves numerical methods for partial differential equations, especially those modeling fluid dynamics, gas dynamics, and chemotaxis. Educated in the Soviet Union and Israel, she works in the US as LeRoy B. Martin, Jr. Distinguished Professor of Mathematics and head of the Department of Mathematics at North Carolina State University.

== Education and career ==
Chertock earned a master's degree in applied mathematics from Moscow State University in 1989, and a Ph.D. in applied mathematics from Tel Aviv University in 1999. Her doctoral dissertation, Strict stability of high-order compact implicit finite-difference schemes: the role of boundary conditions for hyperbolic PDEs, was supervised by Saul Abarbanel.

After postdoctoral research at the University of California, Berkeley and Lawrence Berkeley National Laboratory, she joined North Carolina State University as an assistant professor of mathematics in 2002. She was promoted to associate professor in 2007 and full professor in 2013. She has been department head there since 2015.

== Recognition ==
Chertock was named as the LeRoy B. Martin, Jr. Distinguished Professor in 2021. She was named as a Fellow of the Society for Industrial and Applied Mathematics (SIAM) in 2023, "for significant contributions to numerical methods for hyperbolic systems of conservation laws and important service to the applied mathematics community".
