= Janice Coen =

Atmospheric scientist

- Education: Grove City College (B.S., 1986) University of Chicago (M.S, Ph.D)
- Scientific career
- Fields: Wildland Fire Modeling
- Workplaces: National Center for Atmospheric Research

Janice Coen is a Project Scientist at the National Center for Atmospheric Research in Boulder, Colorado. Her work focuses on understanding and predicting wildland fire behavior through the use of wildfire modeling software. She has made major contributions to the field through her coupled weather—wildland fire computer simulation models.

== Education ==
Janice Coen graduated magna cum laude from Grove City College in 1986 with a B.S. in Engineering Physics. She then went on to receive her M.S. and Ph.D. in the Department of Geophysical Sciences of the University of Chicago in 1988 and 1992, respectively.

== Career and research ==
Since 1993, Coen has held various positions at the National Center for Atmospheric Research (NCAR) in Boulder, CO. Since June 2018, she has been a Project Scientist III in the Mesoscale and Microscale Meteorology Laboratory of NCAR.

Coen studies wildland fire behavior from a variety of perspectives, but the majority of her research over the last 25 years has advocated for the utility of wildland fire modeling software. Wildfire simulation models are generated by collecting a myriad of data such as fuel load/moisture, wind speed, temperature, pressure, topography, etc. and leveraging those data to simulate wildfire behavior to aid in wildfire suppression. Coen has developed two coupled numerical weather prediction – wildland fire behavior models that have become widespread in the research community and transformed how people interpret fire behavior.

Coen's current work focuses on large wildfire events and the use of weather-fire modeling software to better understand wildfire behavior.

Coen's 2005 Coupled Atmosphere Wildland Fire-Environment (CAWFE) model represents the most advanced modeling systems in use today. The CAWFE model combines a numerical weather prediction (NWP) model with a wildland fire behavior module. This model was created to better account for interactions between the unique weather (extreme wind conditions, fire whirls, fire tornados, horizontal roll vertices, pyrocumulus) and behavior (e.g. flanking, running, backing) endemic to wildland fire.

CAWFE incorporates data from the three main environmental factors that affect wildland fire behavior: weather, fuel characteristics, and topography. Unlike other models such as BehavePlus and FARSITE that treat these three pillars as independent phenomena, CAWFE accounts for the fact that there are interactions and feedbacks between these three predominant factors (e.g. topographic influences on fuel moisture with variance in elevation, aspect, etc.). CAWFE explicitly considers the feedback mechanisms between atmospheric dynamics and fire behavior over time, and it remains the most capable modeling tool to predict a fire's intensity and spread.

== Editorships and awards ==
- Associate editor for the International Journal of Wildland Fire
- Member of the editorial board for the journal Environmental Modeling and Software
- Member of the Board of Directors for the International Association of Wildland Fire.
- Member of team awarded the 2018 Foundation Medal from the National Fire Protection Agency.
- In the September 2018 issue of Fire, Coen was recognized on a list of "Women Leaders in Fire Science"

== Selected publications ==
Coen, J. L., W. Schroeder, B. Quayle, 2018: The generation and forecast of extreme winds during the origin and progression of the 2017 Tubbs Fire. Atmosphere, 9, 462.

Coen, J. L. 2018: Some requirements for simulating wildland fire behavior using insight from coupled weather-wildland fire models. Fire. 1, 6.

Coen, J. L., E. N. Stavros, and J. A. Fites-Kaufman 2018: Deconstructing the King megafire. Ecological Applications. doi:10.1002/eap.1752.

Coen, J. L. and W. Schroeder, 2017: Coupled Weather-Fire Modeling: from Research to Operational Forecasting. Fire Management Today. 75:39-45.

Coen, J. L. and W. Schroeder, 2015: The High Park Fire: Coupled weather-wildland fire model simulation of a windstorm-driven wildfire in Colorado's Front Range. J. Geophys. Res. Atmos. 120:131-146 (doi: 10.1002/2014JD021993)

Coen, J. L. and W. Schroeder, 2013: Use of spatially refined remote sensing fire detection data to initialize and evaluate coupled weather-wildfire growth model simulations. Geophys. Res. Lett. 40:5536-5541. (doi:10.1002/2013GL057868)

Coen, J. L. and P. J. Riggan, 2014: Simulation and thermal imaging of the 2006 Esperanza wildfire in southern California: Application of a coupled weather-wildland fire model. International Journal of Wildland Fire 23, 755-770. http://dx.doi.org/10.1071/WF12194

Coen, J.L., 2011. Some new basics of fire behavior. Fire Management Today, 71, 37-42.
