= Irina Tezaur =

American applied mathematician

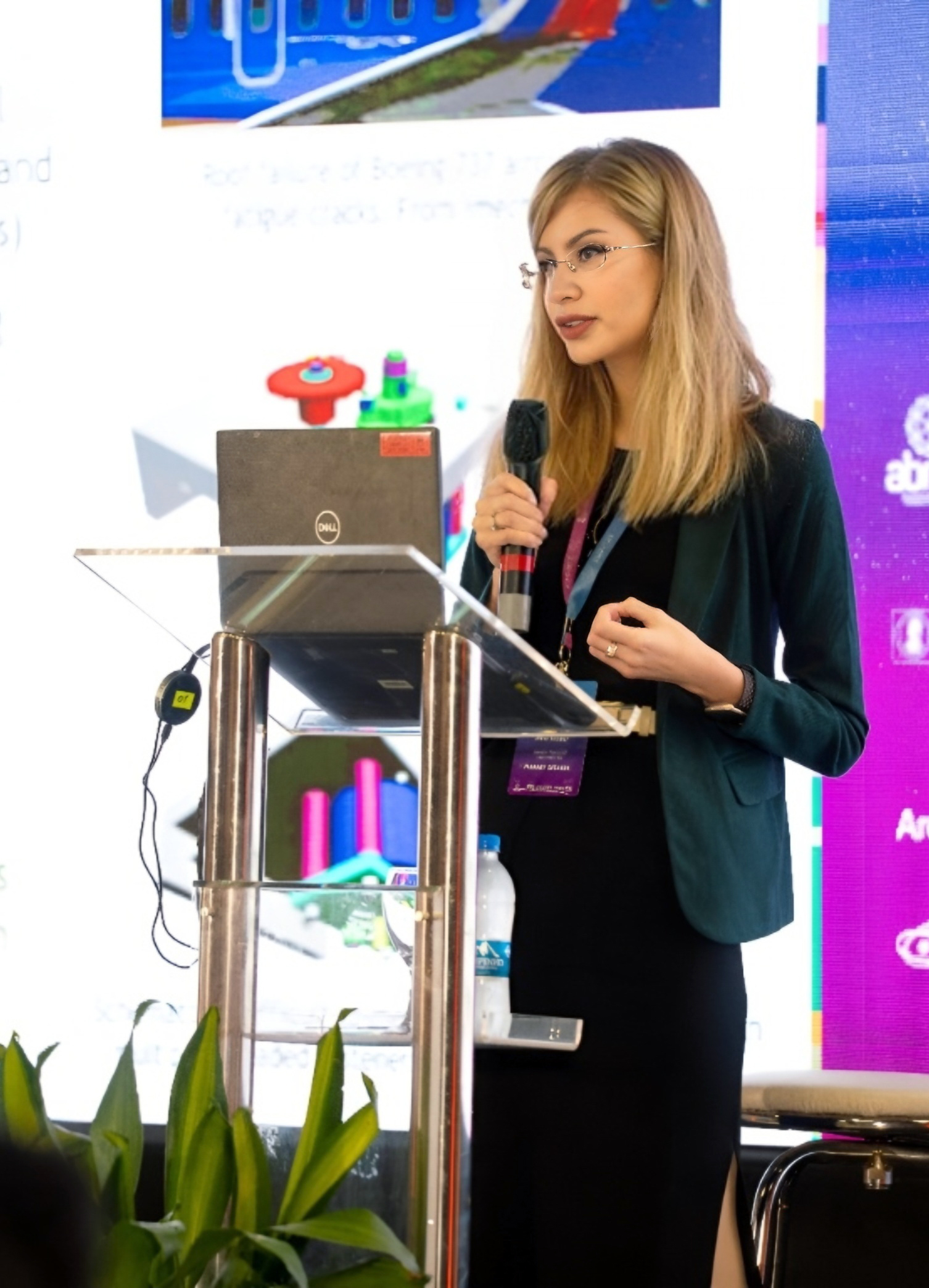
- Irina Tezaur delivering an invited plenary lecture at CILAMCE 2025, held in Vitoria, Brazil in November 2025.
- Born: c. 1984; Moscow, Russia
- Education: Stanford University; University of Pennsylvania
- Awards: Robert J. Melosh Medal in Finite Element Analysis (2008); Presidential Early Career Award for Scientists and Engineers (2019)
- Scientific career
- Fields: Applied mathematics Computational science Model order reduction Finite element discretizations High-performance computing Computational fluid dynamics Computational mechanics Multiscale coupling Earth system modeling Ice sheet modeling
- Workplaces: Sandia National Laboratories
- Thesis: The Discontinuous Enrichment Method for Multi-Scale Transport Problems (2011)
- Doctoral advisor: Charbel Farhat

Irina Kalashnikova Tezaur (born c. 1984, also published as Irina Kalashnikova) is an American applied mathematician and a distinguished member of the technical staff at Sandia National Laboratories in Livermore, California. During her career, she has made research contributions to several areas, including high-order discontinuous Galerkin methods, model order reduction, multiscale modeling, computational fluid dynamics of compressible flow, Earth system modeling, and concurrent multiscale coupling via the Schwarz alternating method.

== Education and career ==
Tezaur emigrated from Moscow, Russia to the United States with her parents, a computer scientist and a physicist, in 1992. Initially, they lived in Oak Park, Michigan, later moving to nearby West Bloomfield. She attended Cranbrook Kingswood Upper School, graduating in 2002. Tezaur majored in mathematics and minored in actuarial science at the University of Pennsylvania, graduating in 2006 with both a bachelor's and master's degree. She went to Stanford University for continued study in computational and mathematical engineering, and completed her Ph.D. in 2011 under the supervision of Charbel Farhat. Her Ph.D. dissertation is entitled "The Discontinuous Enrichment Method for Multi-Scale Transport Problems".

Tezaur's graduate studies also included work as a year-round technical intern at Sandia, in its Aerosciences Department, and, when she finished her Ph.D., she became a senior member of the technical staff in Sandia's Computational Mathematics Department. She was promoted to principal member in 2015 and distinguished member in 2021.

== Recognition ==
In 2008, Tezaur was awarded the Robert J. Melosh Medal in Finite Element Analysis for her Ph.D. research involving the discontinuous enrichment method. Tezaur is a 2019 recipient of the Presidential Early Career Award for Scientists and Engineers, honored "for developing new, impactful mathematical methods and computer algorithms to enable real-time analysis, control and decision-making on computationally prohibitive problems relevant to the nuclear security mission and climate modeling". Tezaur has delivered invited plenary lectures at several international conferences, including the 2024 European Seminar on COmputing (ESCO), the 46th Ibero-Latin American Congress on Computational Methods in Engineering (CILAMCE 2025), and the 2026 Society for Industrial and Applied Mathematics (SIAM) Conference on the Mathematics of Planet Earth (MPE).
