= Coarse space =

In mathematics, coarse space may refer to

- Coarse structure, a family of sets in geometry and topology to measure large-scale properties of a space
- Coarse space (numerical analysis), a reduced representation of a numerical problem
