= Numerical methods for differential equations =

Numerical methods for differential equations may refer to:

- Numerical methods for ordinary differential equations, methods used to find numerical approximations to the solutions of ordinary differential equations
- Numerical methods for partial differential equations, the branch of numerical analysis that studies the numerical solution of partial differential equations

== See also ==
- Differential equations
- Numerical analysis#Differential equations
