= Mortar methods =

In numerical analysis, mortar methods are discretization methods for partial differential equations, which use separate finite element discretization on nonoverlapping subdomains. The meshes on the subdomains do not match on the interface, and the equality of the solution is enforced by Lagrange multipliers, judiciously chosen to preserve the accuracy of the solution. Mortar discretizations lend themselves naturally to the solution by iterative domain decomposition methods such as FETI and balancing domain decomposition In the engineering practice in the finite element method, continuity of solutions between non-matching subdomains is implemented by multiple-point constraints.

Similar to penalty methods, mortar methods are explicit in their nature, i.e. they require the contacting surfaces to be defined. This is in contrast to fully implicit methods, such as the third medium contact method, where contacting surfaces do not need to be defined.
