= Hermann Schwarz =

German mathematician (1843–1921)

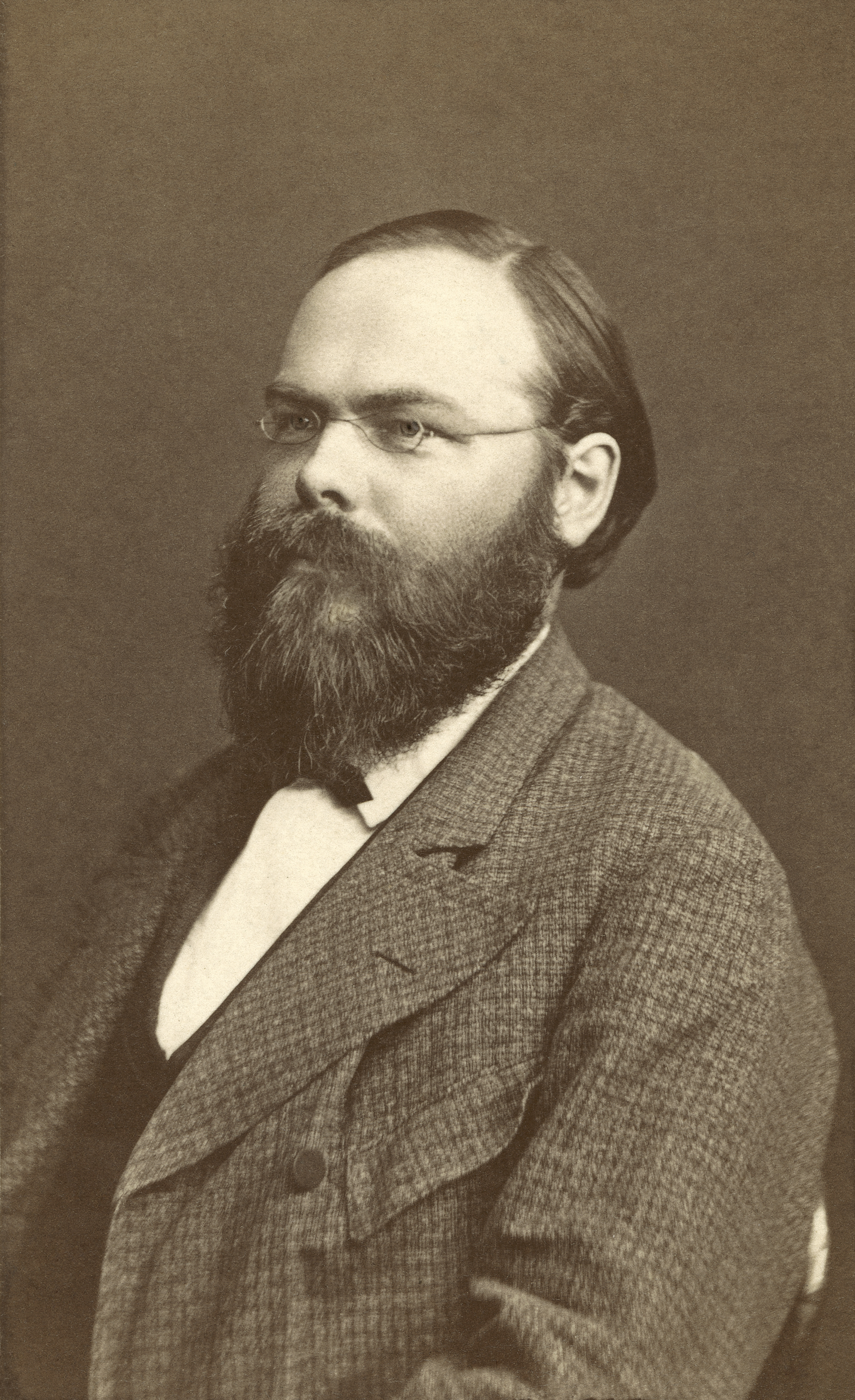
- Schwarz, c. 1890
- Born: 25 January 1843; Hermsdorf, Silesia, Prussia
- Died: 30 November 1921 (aged 78); Berlin, Germany
- Education: Gewerbeinstitut
- Known for: Cauchy–Schwarz inequality
- Scientific career
- Fields: Mathematician
- Workplaces: University of Halle; Swiss Federal Polytechnic; Göttingen University
- Doctoral advisor: Karl Weierstrass; Ernst Kummer
- Doctoral students: Lipót Fejér; Harris Hancock; Gerhard Hessenberg; Paul Koebe; Leon Lichtenstein; Heinrich Maschke; Robert Remak; Rudolf Rothe; Theodor Vahlen; Ernst Zermelo

Karl Hermann Amandus Schwarz (German: [ˈhɛʁman ˈʃvaʁts]; 25 January 1843 – 30 November 1921) was a German mathematician, known for his work in complex analysis.

== Life ==
Schwarz was born in Hermsdorf, Silesia (now Sobieszów, Poland). In 1868 he married Marie Kummer, who was the daughter to the mathematician Ernst Eduard Kummer and Ottilie née Mendelssohn (a daughter of Nathan Mendelssohn and granddaughter of Moses Mendelssohn). Schwarz and Kummer had six children, including his daughter Emily Schwarz.

Schwarz originally studied chemistry in Berlin but Ernst Eduard Kummer and Karl Theodor Wilhelm Weierstrass persuaded him to change to mathematics. He received his Ph.D. from the Universität Berlin in 1864 and was advised by Kummer and Weierstrass. Between 1867 and 1869 he worked at the University of Halle, then at the Swiss Federal Polytechnic. From 1875 he worked at Göttingen University, dealing with the subjects of complex analysis, differential geometry and the calculus of variations. He died in Berlin on 30 November 1921.

== Work ==
Schwarz's works include Bestimmung einer speziellen Minimalfläche, which was crowned by the Berlin Academy in 1867 and printed in 1871, and Gesammelte mathematische Abhandlungen (1890).

Among other things, Schwarz improved the proof of the Riemann mapping theorem, developed a special case of the Cauchy–Schwarz inequality, and gave a proof that the ball has less surface area than any other body of equal volume. His work on the latter allowed Émile Picard to show solutions of differential equations exist (the Picard–Lindelöf theorem).

In 1892 he became a member of the Berlin Academy of Science and a professor at the University of Berlin, where his students included Lipót Fejér, Paul Koebe and Ernst Zermelo. In total, he advised at least 22 Ph. D students. In 1914 Schwarz's friends and former students published a volume with 34 articles in celebration of the 50th anniversary of his doctoral dissertation.

His name is attached to many ideas in mathematics, including the following:

- Abstract additive Schwarz method
- Additive Schwarz method
- Schwarz alternating method
- Schwarzian derivative
- Schwarz function
- Schwarz lantern
- Schwarz lemma
- Schwarz's list
- Schwarz minimal surface
- Schwarz theorem (also known as Clairaut's theorem)
- Schwarz integral formula
- Schwarz–Christoffel mapping
- Schwarz–Ahlfors–Pick theorem
- Schwarz reflection principle
- Schwarz triangle
- Schwarz triangle function
- Cauchy–Schwarz inequality
- Theorem of Pohlke and Schwarz

== Publications ==
- Schwarz, H. A. (1871), Bestimmung einer speziellen Minimalfläche, Dümmler
- Schwarz, H. A. (1972) [1890], Gesammelte mathematische Abhandlungen. Band I, II, Bronx, N.Y.: AMS Chelsea Publishing, ISBN 978-0-8284-0260-6, MR 0392470
