= Neumann–Dirichlet method =

In mathematics, the Neumann–Dirichlet method is a domain decomposition preconditioner which involves solving Neumann boundary value problem on one subdomain and Dirichlet boundary value problem on another, adjacent across the interface between the subdomains. On a problem with many subdomains organized in a rectangular mesh, the subdomains are assigned Neumann or Dirichlet problems in a checkerboard fashion.

== See also ==
- Neumann–Neumann method
