= Schwarz function =

Mathematics function in complex analysis

The Schwarz function of a curve in the complex plane is an analytic function which maps the points of the curve to their complex conjugates. It can be used to generalize the Schwarz reflection principle to reflection across arbitrary analytic curves, not just across the real axis.

The Schwarz function exists for analytic curves. More precisely, for every non-singular, analytic Jordan arc $\Gamma$ in the complex plane, there is an open neighborhood $\Omega$ of $\Gamma$ and a unique analytic function $S$ on $\Omega$ such that $S(z) = \overline{z}$ for every $z \in \Gamma$.

The "Schwarz function" was named by Philip J. Davis and Henry O. Pollak (1958) in honor of Hermann Schwarz, who introduced the Schwarz reflection principle for analytic curves in 1870. However, the Schwarz function does not explicitly appear in Schwarz's works.

== Examples ==
The unit circle is described by the equation $|z|^2 = 1$, or $\overline{z} = 1/z$. Thus, the Schwarz function of the unit circle is $S(z) = 1/z$.

A more complicated example is an ellipse defined by $(x/a)^2 + (y/b)^2 = 1$. The Schwarz function can be found by substituting $\textstyle x = \frac{z + \overline{z}}{2}$ and $\textstyle y = \frac{z - \overline{z}}{2i}$ and solving for $\overline{z}$. The result is:

$$S(z) = \frac{1}{a^2-b^2} \left( (a^2+b^2)z - 2ab\sqrt{z^2+b^2-a^2} \right)$$.

This is analytic on the complex plane minus a branch cut along the line segment between the foci $\pm \sqrt{a^2-b^2}$.
