= Neumann–Neumann methods =

In mathematics, Neumann–Neumann methods are domain decomposition preconditioners named so because they solve a Neumann problem on each subdomain on both sides of the interface between the subdomains. Just like all domain decomposition methods, so that the number of iterations does not grow with the number of subdomains, Neumann–Neumann methods require the solution of a coarse problem to provide global communication. The balancing domain decomposition is a Neumann–Neumann method with a special kind of coarse problem.

More specifically, consider a domain Ω, on which we wish to solve the Poisson equation

$$-\Delta u = f, \qquad u|_{\partial\Omega} = 0$$

for some function f. Split the domain into two non-overlapping subdomains Ω_{1} and Ω_{2} with common boundary Γ and let u_{1} and u_{2} be the values of u in each subdomain. At the interface between the two subdomains, the two solutions must satisfy the matching conditions

$$u_1 = u_2, \qquad \partial_{n_1} u_1 = \partial_{n_2} u_2$$

where $n_{i}$ is the unit normal vector to Γ in each subdomain.

An iterative method with iterations k = 0, 1, ... for the approximation of each u_{i} (i = 1, 2) that satisfies the matching conditions is to first solve the Dirichlet problems

$$\begin{align}
-&\Delta u_i^{(k)} = f_i ~~ \text{in} ~~ \Omega_{i},\\[1.3ex]
&\left.u_i^{(k)}\right|_{\partial\Omega} = 0, \quad
\left.u^{(k)}_i\right|_\Gamma = \lambda^{(k)}
\end{align}$$

for some function λ^{(k)} on Γ, where λ^{(0)} is any inexpensive initial guess. We then solve the two Neumann problems

$$\begin{align}
-&\Delta\psi_i^{(k)} = 0 ~~ \text{in} ~ \Omega_i , \\[1.3ex]
&\left.\psi_i^{(k)}\right|_{\partial\Omega} = 0, \quad
\left.\partial_{n_i}\psi_i^{(k)}\right|_\Gamma = \omega \left(\partial_{n_1}u_1^{(k)} + \partial_{n_2}u_2^{(k)}\right).
\end{align}$$

We then obtain the next iterate by setting

$$\lambda^{(k+1)} = \lambda^{(k)} - \omega \left(\theta_1\psi_1^{(k)} + \theta_2\psi_2^{(k)}\right) ~~ \text{on} ~ \Gamma$$

for some parameters ω, θ_{1} and θ_{2}.

This procedure can be viewed as a Richardson iteration for the iterative solution of the equations arising from the Schur complement method.

This continuous iteration can be discretized by the finite element method and then solved—in parallel—on a computer. The extension to more subdomains is straightforward, but using this method as stated as a preconditioner for the Schur complement system is not scalable with the number of subdomains; hence the need for a global coarse solve.

== See also ==
- Neumann–Dirichlet method
