= Frederica Darema =

American computer scientist

Frederica Darema (in Greek "Φρειdeρίκη Δαρεμά" ("Freiderìki Daremà"))
- Education: University of Athens; Illinois Institute of Technology; University of California, Davis
- Awards: Fulbright Scholar; Fellow of the Institute of Electrical and Electronics Engineers; Institute of Electrical and Electronics Engineers Award
- Scientific career
- Fields: Physics
- Workplaces: University of Pittsburgh; Brookhaven National Laboratory; Schlumberger-Doll Research Center; IBM Thomas J. Watson Research Center; Defense Advanced Research Projects Agency; National Science Foundation; Air Force Office of Scientific Research

Frederica Darema is a Greek-American physicist. She proposed the SPMD programming model in 1984 and Dynamic Data Driven Application Systems (DDDAS) in 2000. She was elected IEEE Fellow in 2004.

== Biography ==
Darema received her BS degree from the school of physics and mathematics of the University of Athens - Greece, and MS and Ph. D. degrees in theoretical nuclear physics from the Illinois Institute of Technology and the University of California, Davis, respectively, where she attended as a Fulbright Scholar and a distinguished scholar. After physics research associate positions at the University of Pittsburgh and Brookhaven National Laboratory, she received an APS Industrial Fellowship and became a technical staff member in the nuclear sciences department at Schlumberger Doll Research. Subsequently, in 1982, she joined the IBM Thomas J. Watson Research Center as a research staff member in the computer sciences department and later on she established and became the manager of a research group at IBM Research on parallel applications. Darema has been at the National Science Foundation since 1994, where she has managed the New Generation Software and Dynamic Data Driven Application Systems programs. During 1996-1998 she completed a two-year assignment at DARPA. She is now at the Air Force Office of Scientific Research.
