= Lebedev quadrature =

In numerical analysis, Lebedev quadrature, named after Vyacheslav Ivanovich Lebedev, is an approximation to the surface integral of a function over the unit sphere in three dimensions. The grid is constructed so as to have octahedral rotation and inversion symmetry. The number and location of the grid points together with a corresponding set of integration weights are determined by enforcing the exact integration of polynomials (or equivalently, spherical harmonics) up to a given order, leading to a sequence of increasingly dense grids analogous to the one-dimensional Gauss–Legendre scheme.

The Lebedev grid is often employed in the numerical evaluation of volume integrals in the spherical coordinate system, where it is combined with a one-dimensional integration scheme for the radial coordinate. Applications of the grid are found in fields such as computational chemistry and neutron transport.

== Angular integrals ==
The surface integral of a function over the unit sphere,
$$I[f] = \int \mathrm{d}\Omega\, f(\Omega) = \int_0^\pi \sin(\theta) \,\mathrm{d}\theta \int_0^{2\pi}\mathrm{d}\varphi\, f(\theta,\varphi),$$
is approximated in the Lebedev scheme as
$$\tilde{I}[f] = 4\pi \sum_{i=1}^N w_i f(\theta_i, \varphi_i),$$
where the particular grid points and grid weights are to be determined. In contrast to product grids, which discretize the θ and φ integrals separately, the Lebedev scheme uses a single sum over points distributed over the whole sphere.

=== Comparison with other schemes ===
A Lebedev rule that integrates all polynomials up to degree n exactly has about (n + 1)^{2}/3 points. The product of a Gauss–Legendre rule in cos θ with a trapezoidal rule in φ needs about (n + 1)^{2}/2 points for the same degree, so that the Lebedev grid saves about one third of the points. Its points are distributed nearly uniformly, whereas product grids crowd points near the poles. In density functional theory calculations, Lebedev grids were found to be more efficient than product grids, although product grids allow a faster evaluation, make it easier to fine-tune the grid, and simplify the use of symmetries of the integrand to remove equivalent points. For orientational averaging in solid-state nuclear magnetic resonance, Lebedev grids were found to be more efficient than the grids traditionally used in that field.

On the other hand, Lebedev rules are available only for a limited set of degrees, up to 131, and their points and weights must be taken from tables; some of the tabulated rules have negative weights. Rules of different degree have almost no points in common. An error estimate obtained by comparing two Lebedev rules therefore requires two independent sets of function evaluations, whereas product grids can be built from one-dimensional rules whose points are reused when the grid is refined, such as the trapezoidal rule with a doubled number of points. Rules invariant under other symmetry groups can need fewer points than Lebedev rules of the same degree, at least for low degrees (see below).

Lebedev rules, like product rules and spherical designs, are global rules: one rule covers the whole sphere. For smooth integrands they converge rapidly. For integrands with sharp localized features, such as peaks or discontinuities, all global rules converge slowly. Then local rules may be preferable, in which the sphere is divided into spherical triangles, each triangle is treated with a low-order rule, and the triangles are subdivided adaptively where the estimated error is largest, or the node density is increased near the features of the integrand.

== Construction ==
Distinct classes of grid points
	Typical element	Constraint	Number of points
$a^1$	$(1, 0, 0)$		6
$a^2$	$\frac{1}{\sqrt{2}} (1, 1, 0)$		12
$a^3$	$\frac{1}{\sqrt{3}} (1, 1, 1)$		8
$b^k$	$(l_k, l_k, m_k)$	$2l_k^2 + m_k^2 = 1$	24
$c^k$	$(p_k, q_k, 0)$	$p_k^2 + q_k^2 = 1$	24
$d^k$	$(r_k, u_k, w_k)$	$r_k^2 + u_k^2 + w_k^2 = 1$	48

The Lebedev grid points are constructed so as to lie on the surface of the three-dimensional unit sphere and to be invariant under the octahedral rotation group with inversion. For any point on the sphere, there are either five, seven, eleven, twenty-three, or forty-seven equivalent points with respect to the octahedral group, all of which are included in the grid. Further, all points equivalent under the rotational and inversion group share the same weights. The smallest such set of points consists of the six points (±1, 0, 0), (0, ±1, 0), (0, 0, ±1) (collectively denoted as a^{1}), leading to an integration scheme
$$\tilde{I}_6 [f] = A_1 \sum_{i=1}^6 f(a_i^1),$$
where the grid weight is A_{1}. Geometrically these points correspond to the vertices of a regular octahedron when aligned with the Cartesian axes. Two more sets of points, corresponding to the centers of the faces and the midpoints of the edges of the octahedron, are all eight sign combinations of $1/\sqrt{3}(\pm 1,\pm 1,\pm 1)$ (denoted as a^{3}), and all twelve permutations and sign combinations of $1/\sqrt{2}(\pm 1, \pm 1, 0)$ (denoted as a^{2}). This selection of grid points gives rise to the scheme
$$\tilde{I}_{26}[f] = A_1 \sum_{i=1}^6 f(a_i^1) + A_2 \sum_{i=1}^{12} f(a_i^2) + A_3\sum_{i=1}^{8}f(a_i^3),$$
where A_{1}, A_{2}, and A_{3} are the weights that still need to be determined. Three further types of points can be employed as shown in the table. Each of these classes can contribute more than one set of points to the grid. In complete generality, the Lebedev scheme is
$$\begin{align}
\tilde{I}_N [f] &= A_1\sum_{i=1}^6 f(a_i^1) + A_2\sum_{i=1}^{12} f(a_i^2) + A_3 \sum_{i=1}^{8} f(a_i^3) \\
&+ \sum_{k=1}^{N_1} B_k \sum_{i=1}^{24} f(b_i^k) + \sum_{k=1}^{N_2} C_k \sum_{i=1}^{24} f(c_i^k) + \sum_{k=1}^{N_3} D_k \sum_{i=1}^{48} f(d_i^k),
\end{align}$$
where the total number of points, N, is
$$N = 26 + 24(N_1 + N_2) + 48N_3,$$
but in some cases A_{2} is set to zero, and the number of points is
$$N = 14 + 24(N_1 + N_2) + 48N_3.$$
The lowest-order rule, exact up to degree 3, consists of the six points a^{1} only.

The determination of the grid weights is achieved by enforcing the scheme to integrate exactly all polynomials up to a given order. On the unit sphere, this is equivalent to integrating all spherical harmonics up to the same order. This problem is simplified by a theorem of Sergei Lvovich Sobolev implying that this condition need be imposed only on those polynomials which are invariant under the octahedral rotation group with inversion. Enforcing these conditions leads to a set of nonlinear equations which have been solved and tabulated up to order 131 in the polynomial.

== Other symmetry groups ==
Sobolev's theorem holds for any finite group of rotations and reflections, so that quadrature rules of the same type can be constructed with other symmetries. A 32-point rule of degree 9 with icosahedral symmetry, consisting of the vertices and face centres of the icosahedron, predates Sobolev's work. McLaren introduced the efficiency
$$\eta = \frac{(n+1)^2}{3N}$$
(the number of spherical harmonics integrated exactly, divided by the number of free parameters of N points) and found an icosahedrally invariant rule of degree 14 with 72 points, η = 25/24. Product rules have η ≈ 2/3, Lebedev rules η ≈ 1. Ahrens and Beylkin constructed rules invariant under the icosahedral rotation group for degrees up to 210, with efficiencies close to 1, but did not publish tables.

In a long series of papers, A. S. Popov searched systematically for the rules with the fewest points, for each degree and for the tetrahedral, octahedral, icosahedral, and dihedral groups, with and without inversion. Among the rules with positive weights and the minimal number of points, he selects the one with the smallest error for spherical harmonics of degree n + 1. For degrees up to 35, the record holders mostly have low, dihedral or tetrahedral, symmetry, and for odd degrees from 13 on they reach η > 1; Lebedev's rules of the same degree need up to about 19% more points. For the icosahedral groups, Popov tabulated the best rules up to degree 79. At such degrees, both the icosahedral rules and Lebedev's rules have efficiencies close to 1. Rules of high symmetry require less storage, since only one point per orbit needs to be stored, and Popov recommends groups with inversion for high degrees. Nodes and weights are published only for some of these rules, and unlike Lebedev's rules they are not widely available in software.
