= Charbel Farhat =

Aerospace engineer and computational mechanic

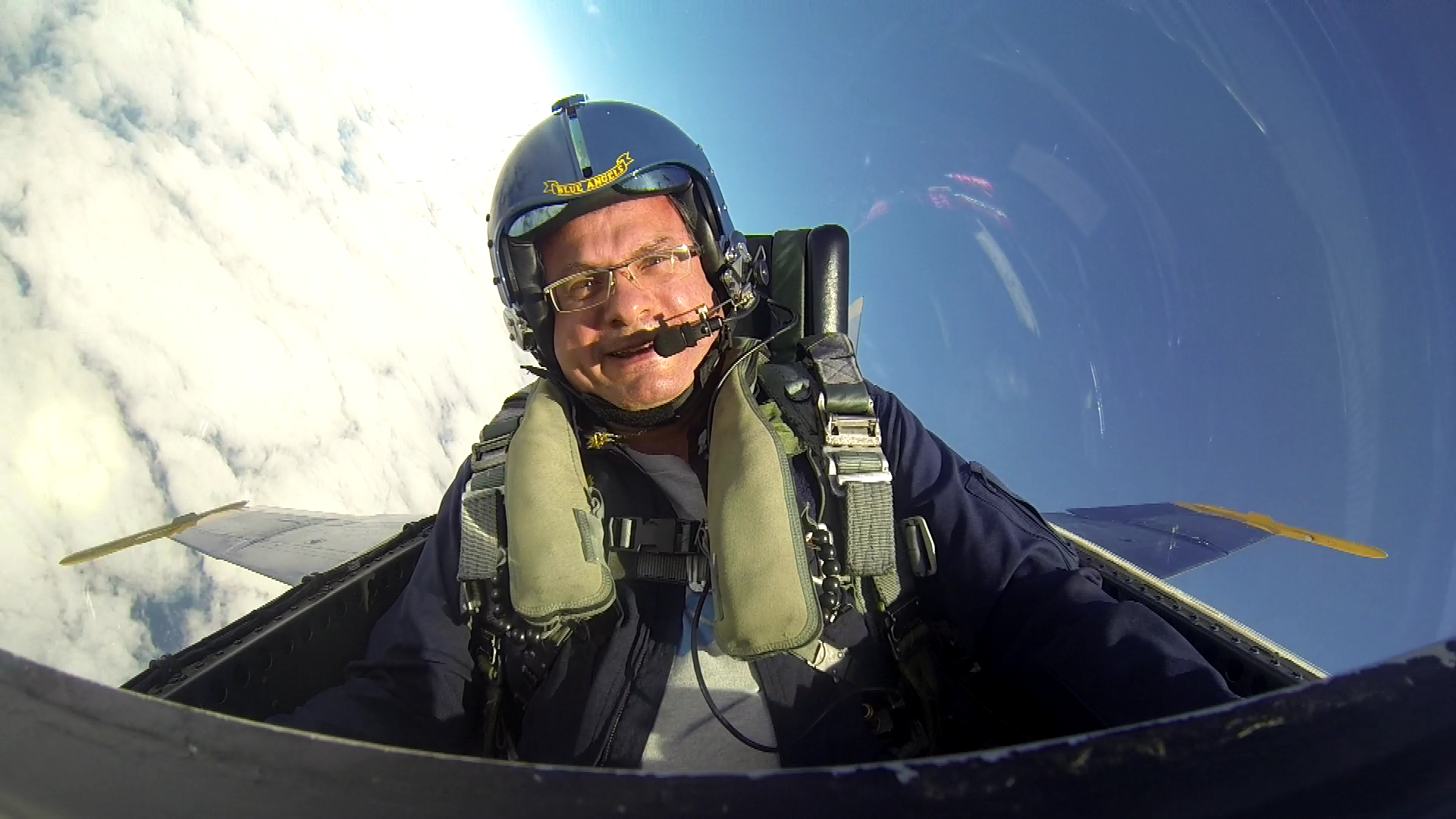
- Farhat in 2014
- Education: École Centrale des Arts et Manufactures (B.S.); Université de Paris VI (M.S.); University of California, Berkeley (M.S., Ph.D)
- Known for: Finite element tearing and interconnecting method Computational fluid–structure interaction Computational aeroelasticity Model order reduction Parallel scientific computing Physics-based machine learning Digital twinning
- Awards: Daniel Guggenheim Medal; Gordon Bell Prize; Sidney Fernbach Award; Vannevar Bush Faculty Fellowship; John von Neumann Medal; Gauss-Newton Medal
- Scientific career
- Fields: Aerospace engineering Computational mechanics High-performance computing Computational fluid dynamics Fluid–structure interaction
- Workplaces: Stanford University; University of Colorado Boulder
- Doctoral students: Irina Tezaur

Charbel Farhat is an aerospace engineer and computational scientist who is the Vivian Church Hoff Professor of Aircraft Structures in the School of Engineering at Stanford University. He is also a professor in Stanford's Institute for Computational and Mathematical Engineering. From 2008 to 2023, he chaired Stanford's Department of Aeronautics and Astronautics, serving from 2022 to 2023 as the inaugural James and Anna Marie Spilker Chair of the department.

Farhat's work is in computational mechanics, high-performance computing, computational fluid dynamics, aeroelasticity, and fluid–structure interaction. He is known for contributions to scalable finite-element algorithms, including the FETI method, and for computational methods for moving-grid fluid dynamics, coupled nonlinear fluid–structure systems, model order reduction, and simulation-based engineering.

He is a member of the National Academy of Engineering, an International Fellow of the Royal Academy of Engineering, and a member of the Lebanese Academy of Sciences. His honors include the Daniel Guggenheim Medal, the Gordon Bell Prize, the Sidney Fernbach Award, a Vannevar Bush Faculty Fellowship, the Kuwait Prize in Applied Sciences, the John von Neumann Medal, and the Gauss-Newton Medal.

== Education ==
Farhat's early higher education was in France. In 1983, he received a Diplôme d'Ingénieur from École Centrale des Arts et Manufactures, the engineering grande école historically known as École Centrale Paris. The same year, he received an M.S. in applied mechanics from Université de Paris VI.

After studying in France, Farhat continued his graduate education at the University of California, Berkeley. Stanford's professional education listing gives an M.S. in structural engineering and structural mechanics from Berkeley in 1984, an M.S. in electrical engineering and computer sciences in 1986, and a Ph.D. in civil engineering in 1987.

== Academic career ==
Farhat began his academic career at the University of Colorado Boulder. He was an assistant professor in the Department of Aerospace Engineering Sciences from 1987 to 1990, an associate professor from 1990 to 1995, and a professor from 1995 to 2004. At Colorado, he also directed the Center for Aerospace Structures from 1996 to 2004, served as interim chair of the Department of Aerospace Engineering Sciences from 1999 to 2000, and chaired the department from 2000 to 2004.

In 2004, Farhat joined Stanford University, where he became a professor in the Institute for Computational and Mathematical Engineering. He later became the Vivian Church Hoff Professor of Aircraft Structures in the School of Engineering. He chaired Stanford's Department of Aeronautics and Astronautics from 2008 to 2023 and served as the department's inaugural James and Anna Marie Spilker Chair from 2022 to 2023.

Farhat has also held a number of research-center and advisory positions. He directed the Army High Performance Computing Research Center at Stanford from 2007 to 2018 and the Stanford-King Abdulaziz City for Science and Technology Center of Excellence for Aeronautics and Astronautics from 2014 to 2024. He served on the Space Technology Industry-Government-University Roundtable from 2017 to 2023, the U.S. Air Force Scientific Advisory Board from 2015 to 2019, and the Bureau of Industry and Security's Emerging Technology and Research Advisory Committee from 2008 to 2018. In 2014, he was designated by the U.S. Navy as a Primary Key-Influencer and flew with the Blue Angels during Fleet Week.

== Research ==
Farhat's research combines numerical analysis, mechanics, computer science, and aerospace engineering. Stanford describes the Farhat Research Group as developing mathematical models, computational algorithms, and high-performance software for the design, analysis, and digital twinning of complex systems in aerospace, marine, mechanical, and naval engineering.

One of Farhat's major contributions is the FETI method, developed with François-Xavier Roux for solving large finite-element systems in parallel. Farhat and collaborators later contributed to related scalable methods, including FETI-DP, for high-performance structural and solid-mechanics simulation.

Farhat has also worked extensively on computational fluid–structure interaction and aeroelasticity. With Philippe Geuzaine and Céline Grandmont, he studied the discrete geometric conservation law and its role in the nonlinear stability of arbitrary Lagrangian-Eulerian schemes for flow problems on moving grids. With Geuzaine and Gregory Brown, he applied a three-field nonlinear fluid–structure formulation to aeroelastic prediction for an F-16 fighter aircraft.

His more recent research interests include high-performance multi-scale modeling, embedded boundary methods for computational fluid dynamics and fluid–structure interaction, Bayesian optimization, uncertainty quantification, physics-based machine learning, mechanics-informed neural networks, nonlinear projection-based model order reduction, and digital twinning.

== Honors and awards ==
Farhat is a member of three national academies: the U.S. National Academy of Engineering, the Royal Academy of Engineering in the United Kingdom, and the Lebanese Academy of Sciences. He is also a fellow of several professional societies, including the American Institute of Aeronautics and Astronautics, American Society of Mechanical Engineers, International Association for Computational Mechanics, Society of Engineering Science, Society for Industrial and Applied Mathematics, United States Association for Computational Mechanics, and World Innovation Foundation.

His major honors include:

- Daniel Guggenheim Medal (2026), awarded for pioneering advances in the computational mechanics of fluid–structure interaction.
- ALERT Geomaterials Medal (2025).
- Aurel Stodola Medal, ETH Zurich (2025).
- TAKREEM AMERICA Foundation Award for Scientific and Technological Achievement (2025).
- SAE International Award for Computational Fluid Dynamics (2025).
- Kuwait Prize in Applied Sciences, Engineering Sciences (2024).
- Olof B. Widlund Prize for Excellence in Domain Decomposition Methods (2024).
- Vannevar Bush Faculty Fellowship (2023).
- Docteur Honoris Causa, École Nationale Supérieure d'Arts et Métiers (2022).
- Commander's Public Service Award, Department of the Air Force (2019).
- Election to the Lebanese Academy of Sciences (2017).
- Docteur Honoris Causa, École Centrale de Nantes (2017).
- Docteur Honoris Causa, École Normale Supérieure Paris-Saclay (2017).
- Spirit of St. Louis Medal, American Society of Mechanical Engineers (2017).
- Ashley Award for Aeroelasticity, American Institute of Aeronautics and Astronautics (2017).
- Grand Prize, Japan Society for Computational Engineering and Science (2017).
- Election as an International Fellow of the Royal Academy of Engineering (2016).
- Gauss-Newton Medal, International Association for Computational Mechanics (2014).
- Election to the National Academy of Engineering (2013).
- Knight in the Order of Academic Palms of France (2011).
- Lifetime Achievement Award, American Society of Mechanical Engineers Computers and Information in Engineering Division (2011).
- Structures, Structural Dynamics and Materials Award, American Institute of Aeronautics and Astronautics (2010).
- John von Neumann Medal, United States Association for Computational Mechanics (2009).
- Gordon Bell Prize (2002).
- Sidney Fernbach Award (1997).
- Presidential Young Investigator Award, National Science Foundation and the White House (1989).

== Editorial and professional service ==
From 2014 to 2024, Farhat served as editor-in-chief of the International Journal for Numerical Methods in Engineering. From 2017 to 2024, he served as editor-in-chief of the International Journal for Numerical Methods in Fluids. He is an associate editor of the Journal of Computational Physics and serves on the editorial boards of several other scientific journals.

== Selected monographs and survey publications ==
- Charbel Farhat and François-Xavier Roux, "Implicit Parallel Processing in Structural Mechanics", Computational Mechanics Advances, Vol. 2, No. 1, pp. 1–124 (1994).
- Charbel Farhat, Domain Decomposition and Parallel Processing, Postgraduate Studies in Supercomputing, FNRS/NFWO, Université de Liège, Belgium (1992).
- Charbel Farhat, An Introduction to Parallel Scientific Computations, Postgraduate Studies in Supercomputing, FNRS/NFWO, Université de Liège, Belgium (1991).
