= WRF-SFIRE =

Atmosphere-wildlife model

WRF-SFIRE is a coupled atmosphere-wildfire model, which combines the Weather Research and Forecasting Model (WRF) with a fire-spread model, implemented by the level-set method. A version from 2010 was released based on the WRF 3.2 as WRF-Fire.
