= Dynamic Data Driven Applications Systems =

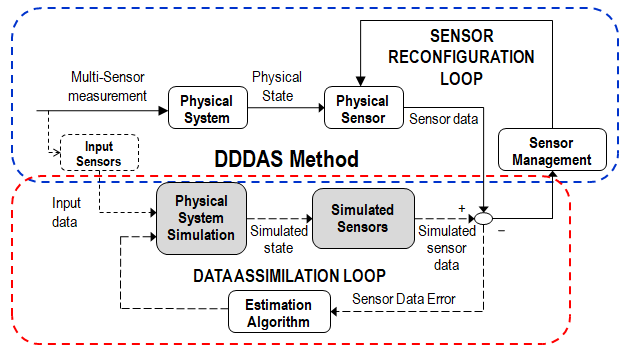
Dynamic Data Driven Applications Systems

Dynamic Data Driven Applications Systems (DDDAS) is a paradigm whereby the computation and instrumentation aspects of an application system are dynamically integrated with a feedback control loop, in the sense that instrumentation data can be dynamically incorporated into the executing model of the application (in targeted parts of the phase-space of the problem to either replace parts of the computation to speed-up the modeling or to make the model more accurate for aspects of the system not well represented by the model; this can be considered as the model "learning" from such dynamic data inputs), and in reverse the executing model can control the system's instrumentation to cognizantly and adaptively acquire additional data (or search through archival data), which in-turn can improve or speedup the model (modeling process). DDDAS-based approaches have been shown that they can enable more accurate and faster modeling and analysis of the characteristics and behaviors of a system and can exploit data in intelligent ways to convert them to new capabilities, including decision support systems with the accuracy of full-scale modeling, executing model-driven adaptive management of complex instrumentation (including adaptive coordination across multitudes of heterogeneous sensors and controllers), as well as efficient data collection, management, and data mining.

The power of the DDDAS paradigm is that it involves a dynamically adapting and system-cognizant model (for example a model cognizant of the physics of the system, or other inherent characteristics and representations of the system), which "learns" and adapts through the "dynamic data" inputs at execution time, can discern false data and avoids the pitfalls of traditional Machine Learning approaches which can go rogue. Moreover, unlike ML methods, DDDAS enables more accurate and faster modeling and analysis, for "systems analytics" rather than simply "data analytics", and the DDDAS computational and instrumentation frameworks, include in addition to comprehensive system-characteristics cognizant representations and models, software and hardware (computational and instrumentation) platforms architectures and services, and can also include the human-in-the-loop, as complex systems typically involve.

DDDAS-based approaches have demonstrated new capabilities in systems modeling and instrumentation, as well as autonomic capabilities in many areas, ranging from fundamental studies in materials properties (e.g., nanomaterials), to structural and civil engineering (e.g., smart buildings) and aerospace, to manufacturing (process planning and control; additive manufacturing), transportation systems, energy systems (e.g., smart power-grids), environmental (e.g., wildfires), weather (atmospheric and space), medical diagnosis and treatment, cloud computing, IoT, and communications systems, cybersecurity, and more. The DDDAS site contains links on the extensive work and impact of the DDDAS paradigm.

== History ==
The DDDAS concept - and the term - was proposed by Frederica Darema starting in the early 80's and 90's; she discussed it in the 80’s referring to it as the “Gedanken Laboratory” and presented these ideas in 1990 at the Conference of the Society of Engineering Sciences. Starting in 1999, Darema initiated the efforts within the National Science Foundation (NSF), and led the organization of a workshop in March 2000, where she designated as academic co-chairs of the workshop Profs Craig Douglas and Abhi Deshmukh.

Around 2008, Darema introduced the term Infosymbiotics or Infosymbiotic Systems to denote DDDAS. Many researchers in academia, industry, and labs were influenced to adopt the DDDAS concept and the term and conducted research under Dr. Darema's programs, starting from the mid-1990's, at DARPA, NSF (including multi-agency programs), and AFOSR. Dr. Blasch continued the program after he became Program Manager at AFOSR upon Dr. Darema becoming the Director of AFOSR in 2016. Thus, a community was formed and advanced systems capabilities and concepts are under the rubric of DDDAS.

Starting in 2000, Dr. Darema led the community in organizing several DDDAS forums; these include a series of DDDAS Workshops, Symposia, Panels, and other related activities, for example: in conjunction with the International Conference in Computational Sciences (ICCS) with Profs. Craig Douglas and Abani Patra; the International Parallel and Distributed Computing Symposium (IPDPS); the Winter Simulation Conferences (WSC). Profs. Dennis Bernstein, Puneet Singla, and Dr. Sai Ravela organized sessions at the American Controls Conference (ACC) 2014. Dr. Ravela organized a related Dynamic Data-driven Environmental Systems Science conference, DyDESS 2014 (MIT), followed by the DDDAS 2016 (Hartford), which included participation by United Technologies Research Center, followed by DDDAS 2017 (MIT) and 2020 (Online) conferences, and hosted the 2022 (MIT) conference, organizing a new collocated Earth, Planets, Climate, and Life theme, CLEPS22. Since 2016, Dr. Blasch has organized numerous DDDAS and other associated forums (e.g., Fusion2015 and follow-up Conference series). The 2024 conference DDDAS2024 was run by Prof. Dimitris Metaxas at Rutgers University (with more conferences planned in the future). The DDDAS conference proceedings are published by Springer. Other work is presented in the DDDAS Handbook series by Springer. A more complete list of DDDAS forums and other activities is provided in the DDDAS website. The March 2023 US National Academies (NASEM) Report on “Foundational Research Gaps and Future Directions for Digital Twins", which speaks about “predictive” capabilities in Digital Twins (DT) approaches, it identifies DDDAS as “an early concept that has all of the elements of a digital twin, including the physical, the virtual, and the two-way interaction via a feedback loop”. The NASEM Report states that (predictive) Digital Twins are holding "immense promise in accelerating scientific discovery and revolutionizing industries." Darema has used the term Dynamic Digital Twins, or DDDAS-based Digital Twins in the proceedings of the DDDAS2022 Conference), and in the subsequent DDDAS Handbooks series.

== Ancillary related concepts ==
DDDAS-based approaches advance the state of the art over a number of somewhat related but more limited concepts, which have been proposed over preceding years, and which are subsets of the more comprehensive and powerful DDDAS paradigm of feedback-control between an executing model of a system with its instrumentation, as was also recognized in the above referenced March 2023 National Academies Digital Twins Report. Prior to that, the 2006 the National Science Foundation Blue Ribbon Panel Report on Simulation-Based Science (SBES), also emphasizes the DDDAS aspect of “symbiotic feedback control system”, and cites DDDAS as a new paradigm, “that will rewrite the book on validation and verification of computer predictions”. The DDDAS concept goes beyond the traditional data assimilation (which did not include the instrumentation control aspect of DDDAS ) and is more powerful than cyber-physical systems (CPS), which is devoid of concrete definition, as to how to “integrate physical dynamics with software and networks". Other limited and superseded efforts include:

- Work in 1950s to 1970s, which were focusing on optimizing experimental methods in a serialized (sequential) process with the human-in-the-loop making the decision on the next experiment to conduct, such as by Chertoff on Sequential Design of Experiments, and by Fedorov on Design of Experiments (1970s), as depicted in Theory of Optimal Experiments, Diagram 1, Page 8 therein.
- Learning methods (starting in the 1980s and 1990s), such as the concept of active learning. In distinction with the DDDAS approaches, the referenced active learning lacks systems-cognizant, first principles modeling. Active sampling strategies based on information gain are common in active and adaptive learning and relate to the design of experiments, e.g., Cohn's work (1994); these methods, however, lack the system-cognizant design or control of instrumentation (experiments), a key capability in DDDAS.
- Reinforcement Learning (in the 90’s, and later than DDDAS) is a data-only driven approach and it’s not utilizing system-cognizant, first-principle models (e.g., physics-based model); for example the Dyna algorithm by Sutton, which is a “trial and error” approach”, rather than the system-cognizant model premise in the DDDAS approaches and which lacks the "model-based control of the system instrumentation" of the DDDAS paradigm.
- The data assimilation concept where observation data are used to correct and constrain uncertainty in computed data-points (computed vector of a physical parameter in the model) is more limited than the DDDAS concept where the dynamic data inputs can replace a patch of the mesh and for multiple parameters. Moreover, the reverse aspect in the DDDAS feedback control loop – that is the model adaptively controlling the instrumentation, was also adopted later by the Data Assimilation concept.
- MacKay's Information-based Active Data Selection (1991) employs Bayesian methods to determine expected informativeness of candidate measurements is used to select salient ones for learning, improving the expected informativeness. And, Information Retrieval (in the 90s), where queries generate searches, and the results refine the queries with relevance feedback; these approaches constitute a limited version of DDDAS.

== See also ==
- Data assimilation
- Control systems
- Uncertainty Quantification
- Active Learning
