= Schwarz alternating method =

Iterative method in conformal mapping

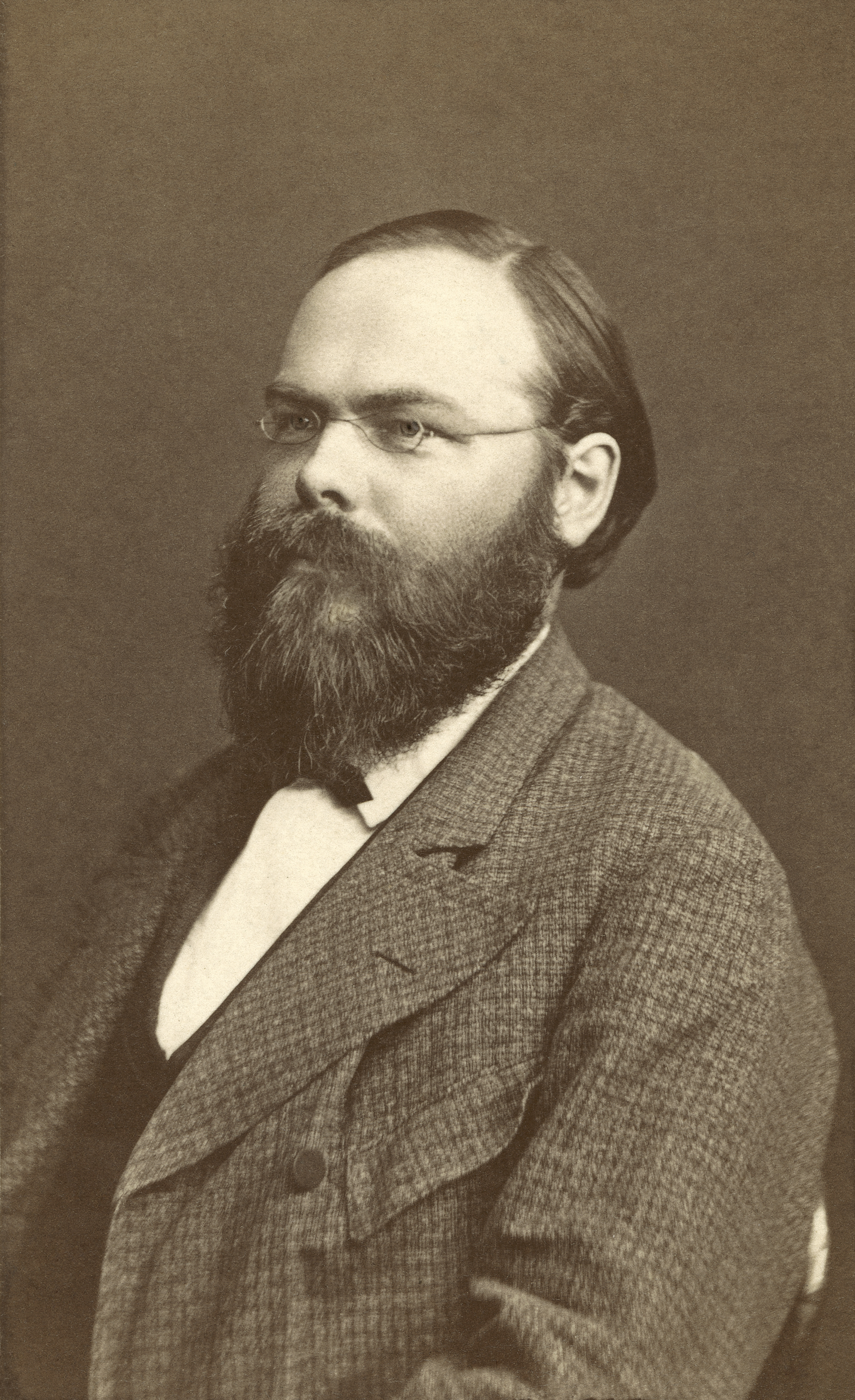
Hermann Schwarz, inventor of the method

In mathematics, the Schwarz alternating method or alternating process is an iterative method introduced in 1869–1870 by Hermann Schwarz in the theory of conformal mapping. Given two overlapping regions in the complex plane in each of which the Dirichlet problem could be solved, Schwarz described an iterative method for solving the Dirichlet problem in their union, provided their intersection was suitably well behaved. This was one of several constructive techniques of conformal mapping developed by Schwarz as a contribution to the problem of uniformization, posed by Riemann in the 1850s and first resolved rigorously by Koebe and Poincaré in 1907. It furnished a scheme for uniformizing the union of two regions knowing how to uniformize each of them separately, provided their intersection was topologically a disk or an annulus. From 1870 onwards Carl Neumann also contributed to this theory.

In the 1950s Schwarz's method was generalized in the theory of partial differential equations to an iterative method for finding the solution of an elliptic boundary value problem on a domain which is the union of two overlapping subdomains. It involves solving the boundary value problem on each of the two subdomains in turn, taking always the last values of the approximate solution as the next boundary conditions. It is used in numerical analysis, under the name multiplicative Schwarz method (in opposition to additive Schwarz method) as a domain decomposition method.

== History ==
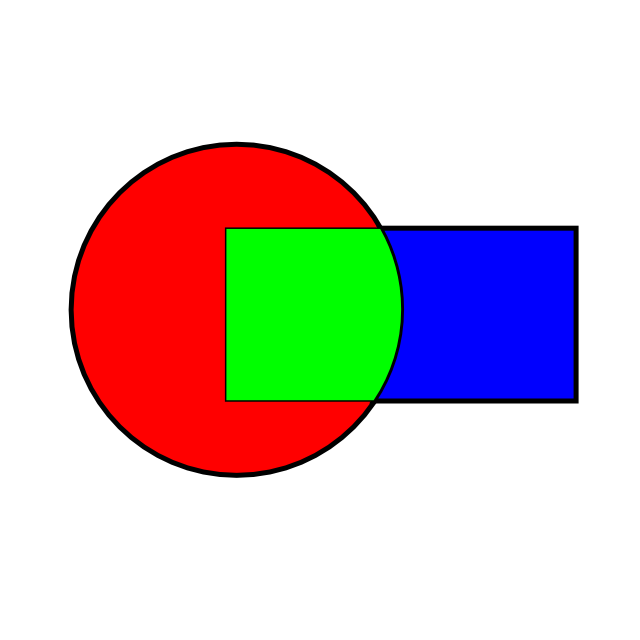
DDM original logo: representation of the problem considered by H. A. Schwarz in 1870. The blue rectangle was originally a square

It was first formulated by H. A. Schwarz and served as a theoretical tool: its convergence for general second order elliptic partial differential equations was first proved much later, in 1951, by Solomon Mikhlin.

== The algorithm ==
The original problem considered by Schwarz was a Dirichlet problem (with the Laplace's equation) on a domain consisting of a circle and a partially overlapping square. To solve the Dirichlet problem on one of the two subdomains (the square or the circle), the value of the solution must be known on the border: since a part of the border is contained in the other subdomain, the Dirichlet problem must be solved jointly on the two subdomains. An iterative algorithm is introduced:

1. Make a first guess of the solution on the circle's boundary part that is contained in the square
2. Solve the Dirichlet problem on the circle
3. Use the solution in (2) to approximate the solution on the square's boundary
4. Solve the Dirichlet problem on the square
5. Use the solution in (4) to approximate the solution on the circle's boundary, then go to step (2).

At convergence, the solution on the overlap is the same when computed on the square or on the circle.

== Optimized Schwarz methods ==
The convergence speed depends on the size of the overlap between the subdomains, and on the transmission conditions (boundary conditions used in the interface between the subdomains). It is possible to increase the convergence speed of the Schwarz methods by choosing adapted transmission conditions: theses methods are then called Optimized Schwarz methods.

== See also ==
- Uniformization theorem
- Schwarzian derivative
- Schwarz triangle map
- Schwarz reflection principle
- Additive Schwarz method
