= Schwarz reflection principle =

Mathematics principle in complex analysis

In mathematics, the Schwarz reflection principle is a way to extend the domain of definition of a complex analytic function, i.e., it is a form of analytic continuation. It states that if an analytic function is defined on the upper half-plane, and has well-defined (non-singular) real values on the real axis, then it can be extended to the conjugate function on the lower half-plane. In notation, if $F(z)$ is a function that satisfies the above requirements, then its extension to the rest of the complex plane is given by the formula, $F(\bar{z}) = \overline{F(z)}.$

That is, we make the definition that agrees along the real axis.

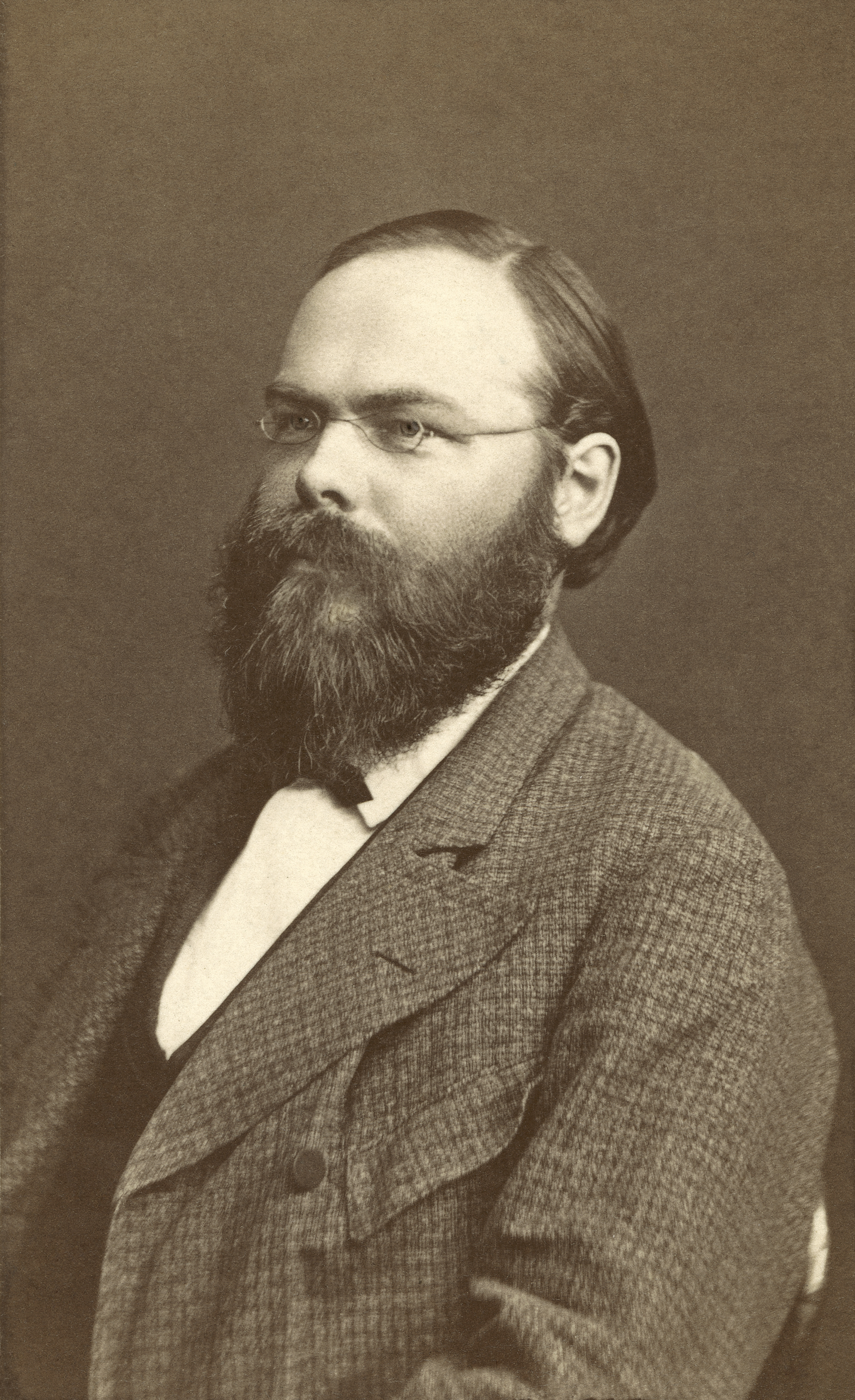
Hermann Schwarz

The result proved by Hermann Schwarz is as follows. Suppose that F is a continuous function on the closed upper half plane $\left\{ z \in \Complex \mid \operatorname{Im}(z) \geq 0 \right\}$, holomorphic on the upper half plane $\left\{ z \in \Complex \mid \operatorname{Im}(z) > 0 \right\}$, which takes real values on the real axis. Then the extension formula given above is an analytic continuation to the whole complex plane.

In practice it would be better to have a theorem that allows F certain singularities, for example F a meromorphic function. To understand such extensions, one needs a proof method that can be weakened. In fact Morera's theorem is well adapted to proving such statements. Contour integrals involving the extension of F clearly split into two, using part of the real axis. So, given that the principle is rather easy to prove in the special case from Morera's theorem, understanding the proof is enough to generate other results.

The principle also adapts to apply to harmonic functions.

== See also ==
- Kelvin transform
- Method of image charges
- Schwarz function
