= Fire Dynamics Simulator =

Computational fluid dynamics model

Fire Dynamics Simulator (FDS) is a computational fluid dynamics (CFD) model of fire-driven fluid flow. The computer program solves numerically a large eddy simulation form of the Navier–Stokes equations appropriate for low-speed, thermally-driven flow, with an emphasis on smoke and heat transport from fires, to describe the evolution of fire.

As of March 2026 the current stable release is FDS 6.10.1 (with companion visualisation tool Smokeview 6.10.1), published by NIST on 18 March 2025. Version 6.10.0, issued on 12 March 2025, added three-dimensional heat conduction and a new heat-flux–scaling pyrolysis model aimed at improving predictions of burning rate for solid fuels. The underlying science and implementation of these features were detailed at FEMTC 2024. A beta branch of FDS 7 is currently being evaluated at NIST’s Sandia FLAME facility.

FDS is free software developed by the National Institute of Standards and Technology (NIST) of the United States Department of Commerce, in cooperation with VTT Technical Research Centre of Finland. Smokeview is the companion visualization program that can be used to display the output of FDS.

The first version of FDS was publicly released in February 2000. To date, about half of the applications of the model have been for design of smoke-handling systems and sprinkler/detector activation studies. The other half consist of residential and industrial fire reconstructions. Throughout its development, FDS has been aimed at solving practical fire problems in fire protection engineering while at the same time providing a tool to study fundamental fire dynamics and combustion. Recent peer-reviewed studies employing FDS include reconstructions of a firefighter line-of-duty death in Pennsylvania, and analysis of fire development in lithium-ion battery energy-storage containers.

The Wildland-Urban Fire Dynamics Simulator (WFDS) is an extension developed by the US Forest Service that is integrated into FDS and allows it to be used for wildfire modeling. It models vegetative fuel either by explicitly defining the volume of the vegetation or, for surface fuels such as grass, by assuming uniform fuel at the air-ground boundary.

FDS is a Fortran program that reads input parameters from a text file, computes a numerical solution to the governing equations, and writes user-specified output data to files. Smokeview is a companion program that reads FDS output files and produces animations on the computer screen. Smokeview has a simple menu-driven interface, while FDS does not. However, there are various third-party programs that have been developed to generate the text file containing the input parameters needed by FDS.

== See also ==
- Wildfire modeling
