= FETI-DP =

The FETI-DP method is a domain decomposition method that enforces equality of the solution at subdomain interfaces by Lagrange multipliers except at subdomain corners, which remain primal variables. The first mathematical analysis of the method was provided by Mandel and Tezaur. The method was further improved by enforcing the equality of averages across the edges or faces on subdomain interfaces which is important for parallel scalability for 3D problems. FETI-DP is a simplification and a better performing version of FETI. The eigenvalues of FETI-DP are same as those of BDDC, except for the eigenvalue equal to one, and so the performance of FETI-DP and BDDC is essentially same.

FETI-DP methods are very suitable for high performance parallel computing. A structural simulation using a FETI-DP algorithm and running on 3783 processors of the ASCI White supercomputer was awarded a Gordon Bell prize in 2002. A recent FETI-DP method has scaled to more than 65000 processor cores of the JUGENE supercomputer solving a model problem.

== See also ==
- BDDC
- FETI
