= Coarse space (numerical analysis) =

In numerical analysis, coarse problem is an auxiliary system of equations used in an iterative method for the solution of a given larger system of equations. A coarse problem is basically a version of the same problem at a lower resolution, retaining its essential characteristics, but with fewer variables. The purpose of the coarse problem is to propagate information throughout the whole problem globally.

In multigrid methods for partial differential equations, the coarse problem is typically obtained as a discretization of the same equation on a coarser grid (usually, in finite difference methods) or by a Galerkin approximation on a subspace, called a coarse space. In finite element methods, the Galerkin approximation is typically used, with the coarse space generated by larger elements on the same domain. Typically, the coarse problem corresponds to a grid that is twice or three times coarser.

Coarse spaces (coarse model, surrogate model) are the backbone of algorithms and methodologies exploiting the space mapping concept for solving computationally intensive engineering modeling and design problems. In space mapping, a fine or high fidelity (high resolution, computationally intensive) model is used to calibrate or recalibrate—or update on the fly, as in aggressive space mapping—a suitable coarse model. An updated coarse model is often referred to as surrogate model or mapped coarse model. It permits fast, but more accurate, harnessing of the underlying coarse model in the exploration of designs or in design optimization.

In domain decomposition methods, the construction of a coarse problem follows the same principles as in multigrid methods, but the coarser problem has much fewer unknowns, generally only one or just a few unknowns per subdomain or substructure, and the coarse space can be of a quite different type that the original finite element space, e.g. piecewise constants with averaging in balancing domain decomposition or built from energy minimal functions in BDDC. The construction of the coarse problem in FETI is unusual in that it is not obtained as a Galerkin approximation of the original problem, however.

In Algebraic Multigrid Methods and in iterative aggregation methods in mathematical economics and Markov chains, the coarse problem is generally obtained by the Galerkin approximation on a subspace. In mathematical economics, the coarse problem may be obtained by the aggregation of products or industries into a coarse description with fewer variables. In Markov chains, a coarse Markov chain may be obtained by aggregating states.

The speed of convergence of multigrid and domain decomposition methods for elliptic partial differential equations without a coarse problem deteriorates with decreasing mesh step (or decreasing element size, or increasing number of subdomains or substructures), thus making a coarse problem necessary for a scalable algorithm.

== See also ==
- Multiscale modeling
