= Wildfire modeling =

Simulation of wildfire behavior

A simple wildfire propagation model.

Wildfire modeling is concerned with numerical simulation of wildfires to comprehend and predict fire behavior. Wildfire modeling aims to aid wildfire suppression, increase the safety of firefighters and the public, and minimize damage. Wildfire modeling can also aid in protecting ecosystems, watersheds, and air quality.

Using computational science, wildfire modeling involves the statistical analysis of past fire events to predict spotting risks and front behavior. Various wildfire propagation models have been proposed in the past, including simple ellipses and egg- and fan-shaped models. Early attempts to determine wildfire behavior assumed terrain and vegetation uniformity. However, the exact behavior of a wildfire's front is dependent on a variety of factors, including wind speed and slope steepness. Some modern growth models utilize a combination of past ellipsoidal descriptions and Huygens' Principle to simulate fire growth as a continuously expanding polygon. Extreme value theory may also be used to predict the size of large wildfires. However, large fires that exceed suppression capabilities are often regarded as statistical outliers in standard analyses, even though fire policies are more influenced by large wildfires than by small fires.

== Objectives ==
Wildfire modeling attempts to reproduce fire behavior, such as how quickly the fire spreads, in which direction, how much heat it generates. A key input to behavior modeling is the Fuel Model, or type of fuel, through which the fire is burning. Behavior modeling can also include whether the fire transitions from the surface (a "surface fire") to the tree crowns (a "crown fire"), as well as extreme fire behavior including rapid rates of spread, fire whirls, and tall well-developed convection columns. Fire modeling also attempts to estimate fire effects, such as the ecological and hydrological effects of the fire, fuel consumption, tree mortality, and amount and rate of smoke produced.

== Environmental factors ==
Wildland fire behavior is affected by weather, fuel characteristics, and topography.

Weather influences fire through wind and moisture. Wind increases the fire spread in the wind direction, higher temperature makes the fire burn faster, while higher relative humidity, and precipitation (rain or snow) may slow it down or extinguish it altogether. Weather involving fast wind changes can be particularly dangerous, since they can suddenly change the fire direction and behavior. Such weather includes cold fronts, foehn winds, thunderstorm downdrafts, sea and land breeze, and diurnal slope winds.

Wildfire fuel includes grass, wood, and anything else that can burn. Small dry twigs burn faster while large logs burn slower; dry fuel ignites more easily and burns faster than wet fuel.

Topography factors that influence wildfires include the orientation toward the sun, which influences the amount of energy received from the sun, and the slope (fire spreads faster uphill). Fire can accelerate in narrow canyons and it can be slowed down or stopped by barriers such as creeks and roads.

These factors act in combination. Rain or snow increases the fuel moisture, high relative humidity slows the drying of the fuel, while winds can make fuel dry faster. Wind can change the fire-accelerating effect of slopes to effects such as downslope windstorms (called Santa Anas, foehn winds, East winds, depending on the geographic location). Fuel properties may vary with topography as plant density varies with elevation or aspect with respect to the sun.

It has long been recognized that "fires create their own weather." That is, the heat and moisture created by the fire feed back into the atmosphere, creating intense winds that drive the fire behavior. The heat produced by the wildfire changes the temperature of the atmosphere and creates strong updrafts, which can change the direction of surface winds. The water vapor released by the fire changes the moisture balance of the atmosphere. The water vapor can be carried away, where the latent heat stored in the vapor is released through condensation.

== Approaches ==
Like all models in computational science, fire models need to strike a balance between fidelity, availability of data, and fast execution. Oftentimes due to the sheer complexity of the task, such as due to the butterfly effect, it is nearly impossible to predict what is likely to happen.

Forest-fire models have been developed since 1940 to the present, but a lot of chemical and thermodynamic questions related to fire behaviour are still to be resolved. Scientists and their forest fire models from 1940 till 2003 are listed in article. Models can be divided into three groups: Empirical, Semi-empirical, and Physically based.

=== Empirical models ===
Conceptual models from experience and intuition from past fires can be used to anticipate the future. Many semi-empirical fire spread equations, as in those published by the USDA Forest Service, Forestry Canada, Nobel, Bary, and Gill, and Cheney, Gould, and Catchpole for Australasian fuel complexes have been developed for quick estimation of fundamental parameters of interest such as fire spread rate, flame length, and fireline intensity of surface fires at a point for specific fuel complexes, assuming a representative point-location wind and terrain slope. Based on the work by Fons's in 1946, and Emmons in 1963, the quasi-steady equilibrium spread rate calculated for a surface fire on flat ground in no-wind conditions was calibrated using data of piles of sticks burned in a flame chamber/wind tunnel to represent other wind and slope conditions for the fuel complexes tested.

Two-dimensional fire growth models such as FARSITE and Prometheus, the Canadian wildland fire growth model designed to work in Canadian fuel complexes, have been developed that apply such semi-empirical relationships and others regarding ground-to-crown transitions to calculate fire spread and other parameters along the surface. Certain assumptions must be made in models such as FARSITE and Prometheus to shape the fire growth. For example, Prometheus and FARSITE use the Huygens principle of wave propagation. A set of equations that can be used to propagate (shape and direction) a fire front using an elliptical shape was developed by Richards in 1990. Although more sophisticated applications use a three-dimensional numerical weather prediction system to provide inputs such as wind velocity to one of the fire growth models listed above, the input was passive and the feedback of the fire upon the atmospheric wind and humidity are not accounted for.

=== Physically based models and coupling with the atmosphere ===
A simplified physically based two-dimensional fire spread models based upon conservation laws that use radiation as the dominant heat transfer mechanism and convection, which represents the effect of wind and slope, lead to reaction–diffusion systems of partial differential equations.

More complex physical models join computational fluid dynamics models with a wildland fire component and allow the fire to feed back upon the atmosphere. These models include NCAR's Coupled Atmosphere-Wildland Fire-Environment (CAWFE) model developed in 2005, WRF-Fire at NCAR and University of Colorado Denver which combines the Weather Research and Forecasting Model with a spread model by the level-set method, University of Utah's Coupled Atmosphere-Wildland Fire Large Eddy Simulation developed in 2009, Los Alamos National Laboratory's FIRETEC developed in, the WUI (wildland–urban interface) Fire Dynamics Simulator (WFDS) developed in 2007, and, to some degree, the two-dimensional model FIRESTAR. These tools have different emphases and have been applied to better understand the fundamental aspects of fire behavior, such as fuel inhomogeneities on fire behavior, feedbacks between the fire and the atmospheric environment as the basis for the universal fire shape, and are beginning to be applied to wildland urban interface house-to-house fire spread at the community-scale.

The cost of added physical complexity is a corresponding increase in computational cost, so much so that a full three-dimensional explicit treatment of combustion in wildland fuels by direct numerical simulation (DNS) at scales relevant for atmospheric modeling does not exist, is beyond current supercomputers, and does not currently make sense to do because of the limited skill of weather models at spatial resolution under 1 km. Consequently, even these more complex models parameterize the fire in some way, for example, papers by Clark use equations developed by Rothermel for the USDA forest service to calculate local fire spread rates using fire-modified local winds. And, although FIRETEC and WFDS carry prognostic conservation equations for the reacting fuel and oxygen concentrations, the computational grid cannot be fine enough to resolve the reaction rate-limiting mixing of fuel and oxygen, so approximations must be made concerning the subgrid-scale temperature distribution or the combustion reaction rates themselves. These models also are too small-scale to interact with a weather model, so the fluid motions use a computational fluid dynamics model confined in a box much smaller than the typical wildfire.

Attempts to create the most complete theoretical model were made by Albini F.A. in USA and Grishin A.M. in Russia. Grishin's work is based on the fundamental laws of physics, conservation and theoretical justifications are provided. The simplified two-dimensional model of running crown forest fire was developed in Belarusian State University by Barovik D.V. and Taranchuk V.B.

== Data assimilation ==
Data assimilation periodically adjusts the model state to incorporate new data using statistical methods. Because fire is highly nonlinear and irreversible, data assimilation for fire models poses special challenges, and standard methods, such as the ensemble Kalman filter (EnKF) do not work well. Statistical variability of corrections and especially large corrections may result in nonphysical states, which tend to be preceded or accompanied by large spatial gradients. In order to ease this problem, the regularized EnKF penalizes large changes of spatial gradients in the Bayesian update in EnKF. The regularization technique has a stabilizing effect on the simulations in the ensemble but it does not improve much the ability of the EnKF to track the data: The posterior ensemble is made out of linear combinations of the prior ensemble, and if a reasonably close location and shape of the fire cannot be found between the linear combinations, the data assimilation is simply out of luck, and the ensemble cannot approach the data. From that point on, the ensemble evolves essentially without regard to the data. This is called filter divergence. So, there is clearly a need to adjust the simulation state by a position change rather than an additive correction only. The morphing EnKF combines the ideas of data assimilation with image registration and morphing to provide both additive and position correction in a natural manner, and can be used to change a model state reliably in response to data.

== Limitations and practical use ==
The limitations on fire modeling are not entirely computational. At this level, the models encounter limits in knowledge about the composition of pyrolysis products and reaction pathways, in addition to gaps in basic understanding about some aspects of fire behavior such as fire spread in live fuels and surface-to-crown fire transition.

Thus, while more complex models have value in studying fire behavior and testing fire spread in a range of scenarios, from the application point of view, FARSITE and Palm-based applications of BEHAVE have shown great utility as practical in-the-field tools because of their ability to provide estimates of fire behavior in real time. While the coupled fire-atmosphere models have the ability to incorporate the ability of the fire to affect its own local weather, and model many aspects of the explosive, unsteady nature of fires that cannot be incorporated in current tools, it remains a challenge to apply these more complex models in a faster-than-real-time operational environment. Also, although they have reached a certain degree of realism when simulating specific natural fires, they must yet address issues such as identifying what specific, relevant operational information they could provide beyond current tools, how the simulation time could fit the operational time frame for decisions (therefore, the simulation must run substantially faster than real time), what temporal and spatial resolution must be used by the model, and how they estimate the inherent uncertainty in numerical weather prediction in their forecast. These operational constraints must be used to steer model development.

== See also ==
- Catastrophe modeling
- Extreme value theory
- Fuel model
