= Balancing domain decomposition method =

In numerical analysis, the balancing domain decomposition method (BDD) is an iterative method to find the solution of a symmetric positive definite system of linear algebraic equations arising from the finite element method. In each iteration, it combines the solution of local problems on non-overlapping subdomains with a coarse problem created from the subdomain nullspaces. BDD requires only solution of subdomain problems rather than access to the matrices of those problems, so it is applicable to situations where only the solution operators are available, such as in oil reservoir simulation by mixed finite elements. In its original formulation, BDD performs well only for 2nd order problems, such elasticity in 2D and 3D. For 4th order problems, such as plate bending, it needs to be modified by adding to the coarse problem special basis functions that enforce continuity of the solution at subdomain corners, which makes it however more expensive. The BDDC method uses the same corner basis functions as, but in an additive rather than multiplicative fashion. The dual counterpart to BDD is FETI, which enforces the equality of the solution between the subdomain by Lagrange multipliers. The base versions of BDD and FETI are not mathematically equivalent, though a special version of FETI designed to be robust for hard problems has the same eigenvalues and thus essentially the same performance as BDD.

The operator of the system solved by BDD is the same as obtained by eliminating the unknowns in the interiors of the subdomain, thus reducing the problem to the Schur complement on the subdomain interface. Since the BDD preconditioner involves the solution of Neumann problems on all subdomain, it is a member of the Neumann–Neumann class of methods, so named because they solve a Neumann problem on both sides of the interface between subdomains.

In the simplest case, the coarse space of BDD consists of functions constant on each subdomain and averaged on the interfaces. More generally, on each subdomain, the coarse space needs to only contain the nullspace of the problem as a subspace.
