= FETI =

In mathematics, in particular numerical analysis, the FETI method (finite element tearing and interconnect) is an iterative substructuring method for solving systems of linear equations from the finite element method for the solution of elliptic partial differential equations, in particular in computational mechanics In each iteration, FETI requires the solution of a Neumann problem in each substructure and the solution of a coarse problem. The simplest version of FETI with no preconditioner (or only a diagonal preconditioner) in the substructure is scalable with the number of substructures but the condition number grows polynomially with the number of elements per substructure. FETI with a (more expensive) preconditioner consisting of the solution of a Dirichlet problem in each substructure is scalable with the number of substructures and its condition number grows only polylogarithmically with the number of elements per substructure. The coarse space in FETI consists of the nullspace on each substructure.

Apart from FETI Dual-Primal (FETI-DP, see below), several extensions have been developed to solve particular physical problems, as FETI Helmholtz (FETI-H), FETI for quasi-incompressible problems, and FETI Contact (FETI-C).

== See also ==
- Balancing domain decomposition
- FETI-DP
