= Adaptive coil combination =

MRI technique

Adaptive coil combination is a method used in Magnetic Resonance Imaging (MRI) to merge signals from multiple receiver coil elements into a single image. A weighted sum of the individual coil images is performed with a different weighting vector $\mathbf{m}$ for each pixel. Each vector $\mathbf{m}$ maximizes the signal-to-noise ratio (SNR) of a region of interest (ROI) around the pixel. $\mathbf{m}$ is calculated using the following equations derived by David O. Walsh:

$$\begin{align}
&R_N=\sum_{(x,y)\in{ROI}}\mathbf{n}(x,y)\mathbf{n}^H(x,y)\\
&R_S=\sum_{(x,y)\in{ROI}}\mathbf{c}(x,y)\mathbf{c}^H(x,y)\\
&\mathbf{m}=\textbf{v}_{max}(R_N^{-1}R_S)
\end{align}$$

For a system with $l$ coils, $\mathbf{n}\in\mathbb{C}^{l}$ and is a column vector of the noise of each coil at location x,y. This can be obtained by capturing images without a subject, or if noise is assumed to be uncorrelated white, $R_N$ becomes identity. $H$ is the conjugate transpose. $\mathbf{c}\in\mathbb{C}^{l}$ and is the measured value of signal + noise at location x,y. $\textbf{v}_{max}$ denotes the largest eigenvector of $R_N^{-1}R_S$. $R_S$ is an estimate of the signal correlation matrix, which works in practice because signal is fairly constant over a small ROI, but thermal noise is white in the image domain so spatial averaging reduces noise-induced bias. The vectors $\textbf{m}$ can be concatenated into a coil sensitivity map and used for techniques like parallel imaging.

== Derivation ==
The following derivation was first published by Walsh. We wish to find a vector $\mathbf{m}\in\mathbb{C}^{l}$ that maximizes SNR over an ROI with $p$ pixels and $l$ coils. If we put the measured signal in our ROI into a matrix $S\in\mathbb{C}^{l \times p}$, and measured noise into a matrix $N\in\mathbb{C}^{l \times p}$ we can write the SNR as:

$$\begin{align}
&Power_{signal}=\frac{|\mathbf{m}^HS|^2}{l}=\frac{\mathbf{m}^HSS^H\mathbf{m}}{l}\\
&Power_{noise}=\frac{|\mathbf{m}^HN|^2}{l}=\frac{\mathbf{m}^HNN^H\mathbf{m}}{l}\\
&\frac{Power_{signal}}{Power_{noise}}=\frac{\mathbf{m}^HSS^H\mathbf{m}}{\mathbf{m}^HNN^H\mathbf{m}}=\frac{\mathbf{m}^HR_S\mathbf{m}}{\mathbf{m}^HR_N\mathbf{m}}\\
\end{align}$$

Because $R_S$ and $R_N$ are Hermitian, we can perform a simultaneous diagonalization with a new matrix $P$ by requiring:

$$\begin{align}
&P^HR_NP=I\\
&P^HR_SP=D
\end{align}$$

where $I$ is identity and $D$ is diagonal. By multiplying the two equations we get:

$$\begin{align}
&P^HR_SP=P^HR_NPD\\
&R_SP=R_NPD\\
&R_N^{-1}R_SP=PD
\end{align}$$

It can be seen that $P$ and $D$ are the eigenvector and eigenvalue matrices respectively of $R_N^{-1}R_S$. Performing a change of basis with $\mathbf{q}=P^{-1}\mathbf{m}$ results in:

$\frac{Power_{signal}}{Power_{noise}}=\frac{\mathbf{q}^HP^HR_SP\mathbf{q}}{\mathbf{q}^HP^HR_NP\mathbf{q}}=\frac{\mathbf{q}^HD\mathbf{q}}{\mathbf{q}^H\mathbf{q}}$

This is the Rayleigh quotient and so the maximum value of $\mathbf{q}$ corresponds to the maximum eigenvector of D, which is $\textbf{q}_{max}=[1,0,\cdots,0]$ when D is sorted by descending order. Therefore $\textbf{m}_{max}=P\textbf{q}_{max}=\textbf{v}_{max}(R_N^{-1}R_S)$.
