= Methoden der mathematischen Physik =

Book by David Hilbert

Methoden der mathematischen Physik (translated into English with the title Methods of Mathematical Physics) is a 1924 book, in two volumes totalling around 1000 pages, published under the names of Richard Courant and David Hilbert. It was a comprehensive treatment of the "methods of mathematical physics" of the time. The second volume is devoted to the theory of partial differential equations. It contains presages of the finite element method, on which Courant would work subsequently, and which would eventually become basic to numerical analysis.

The material of the book was worked up from the content of Hilbert's lectures. While Courant played the major editorial role, many at the University of Göttingen were involved in the writing-up, and in that sense it was a collective production.

On its appearance in 1924 it apparently had little direct connection to the quantum theory questions at the centre of the theoretical physics of the time. That changed within two years, since the formulation of the Schrödinger equation made the Hilbert–Courant techniques of immediate relevance to the new wave mechanics.

There was a second edition (1931/7), wartime edition in the USA (1943), and a third German edition (1968). The English version Methods of Mathematical Physics (1953) was revised by Courant, and the second volume had extensive work done on it by the faculty of the Courant Institute. The books quickly gained the reputation as classics, and are among most highly referenced books in advanced mathematical physics courses.
