= Workshop on Numerical Ranges and Numerical Radii =

Workshop on Numerical Ranges and Numerical Radii (WONRA) is a biennial workshop series on numerical ranges and numerical radii which began in 1992.

== About ==
Numerical ranges and numerical radii are useful in the study of matrix and operator theory. These topics have applications in many subjects in pure and applied mathematics, such as quadratic forms, Banach spaces, dilation theory, control theory, numerical analysis, quantum information science.

== History ==
In the early 1970s, numerical range workshops were organized by Frank Bonsall and John Duncan. More activities were started in early 1990s, including the biennial workshop series, which began in 1992, and special issues devoted to this workshop were published.

=== Workshops ===
#	Year	Location	Organizer(s)	Participation	Workshop photo
1	1992	(United States) Williamsburg, VA, USA	C. Johnson, C.K. Li	33	Photo
2	1994	Coimbra, Portugal,	N. Bebiano	36	Photo
3	1996	Sapporo, Hokkaido, Japan	T. Ando and K. Okubo	36	Photo
4	1998	(United States) Madison, WI, USA	R. Brualdi, C.K. Li	30	Photo
5	2000	Nafplio, Greece	J. Maroulas, M. Tsatsomeros	29	Photo
6	2002	(United States) Auburn, AL, USA	C.K. Li, T.Y. Tam	30	Photo
7	2004	Coimbra, Portugal	N. Bebiano, R. Lemos, G. Soares	40	Photo
8	2006	Bremen, Germany	C.K. Li, L. Rodman, C. Tretter	39	Photo
9	2008	(United States) Williamsburg, VA, USA	C.K. Li	29	Photo
10	2010	Krakow, Poland	C.K. Li, F.H. Szafraniec, J. Zemanek	40	Photo
11	2012	Kaohsiung, Taiwan	C.K. Li, N.C. Wong	48	Photo
12	2014	Sanya, China	S.Y. Cheng, M.D. Choi, C.K. Li	43	Photo
13	2016	Taipei, Taiwan	M.T. Chien, C.K. Li	29	Photo
14	2018	Munich, Germany	D.Farenick, D.Kribs, C.K.Li, S. Plosker, T. Schulte-Herbruggen	32	Photo
15	2019	Kawagoe, Japan	C.K. Li, H. Nakazato, H. Osaka, T. Yamazaki	38	Photo
16	2023	Coimbra, Portugal	N. Bebiano, R. Lemos, A. Nata, G. Soares	25	Photo
17	2025	Taichung, Taiwan	R.K. Lee, C.K. Li, N.S. Sze, M.C. Tsai, Y.S. Wang, N.C. Wong	50	Photo

=== Symposium in conferences ===
Year	Location	Conferences	Organizer(s)
1991	(United States) Minneapolis, USA	Fourth SIAM Conference on Applied Linear Algebra	C.K. Li
2007	Shanghai, China	International Linear Algebra Society Conference	C.K. Li
