= Product numerical range =

Numerical range with respect to the subset of product vectors

Given a Hilbert space with a tensor product structure a product numerical range is defined as a numerical range with respect to the subset of product vectors. In some situations, especially in the context of quantum mechanics product numerical range is known as local numerical range

== Introduction ==
Let $X$ be an operator acting on an $N$-dimensional Hilbert space $\mathcal{H}_N$. Let $\mathrm{\Lambda}(X)$ denote its numerical range, i.e. the set of all $\lambda$ such that there exists a normalized state ${| \psi \rangle}\in \mathcal{H}_N$, $|| \psi || = 1$, which satisfies ${\langle \psi |} X {| \psi \rangle} = \lambda$.

An analogous notion can be defined for operators acting on a composite Hilbert space with a tensor product structure. Consider first a bi–partite Hilbert space, $\mathcal{H}_N = \mathcal{H}_K \otimes \mathcal{H}_M ,$ of a composite dimension $N=KM$.

Let $X$ be an operator acting on the composite Hilbert space. We define the product numerical range $\mathrm{\Lambda}^{\!\otimes}\! \left( X \right)$ of $X$, with respect to the tensor product structure of $\mathcal{H}_N$, as $\mathrm{\Lambda}^{\!\otimes}\! \left( X \right) = \left\{ {\langle \psi_A \otimes \psi_B |} X {| \psi_A\otimes\psi_B \rangle} : {| \psi_A \rangle}\in \mathcal{H}_K, {| \psi_B \rangle}\in \mathcal{H}_M \right\},$ where ${| \psi_A \rangle} \in \mathcal{H}_K$ and ${| \psi_B \rangle} \in \mathcal{H}_M$ are normalized.

== Product numerical radius ==
Let $\mathcal{H}_N = \mathcal{H}_K \otimes \mathcal{H}_M$ be a tensor product Hilbert space. We define the product numerical radius $r^{\otimes}(X)$ of $X$, with respect to this tensor product structure, as $r^{\otimes}(X) = \max\{|z|:z\in\mathrm{\Lambda}^{\!\otimes}\! \left( X \right)\}.$

== Notation ==
The notion of numerical range of a given operator, also called "field of values", has been extensively studied during the last few decades and its usefulness in quantum theory has been emphasized. Several generalizations of numerical range are known. In particular, Marcus introduced the notion of ’’’decomposable numerical range’’’, the properties of which are a subject of considerable interest.

The product numerical range can be considered as a particular case of the decomposable numerical range defined for operators acting on a tensor product Hilbert space. This notion may also be considered as a numerical range relative to the proper subgroup $U(K)\times U(M)$ of the full unitary group $U(KM)$.

== General case ==
It is not difficult to establish the basic properties of the product numerical range which are independent of the partition of the Hilbert space and of the structure of the operator. We list them below leaving some simple items without a proof.

=== Basic properties ===
Topological facts concerning product numerical range for general operators.

1. Product numerical range forms a connected set in the complex plane. This is true because product numerical range is a continuous image of a connected set.
2. Product numerical range is subadditive. For all $A, B\in \mathbb{M}_n$ $\mathrm{\Lambda}^{\!\otimes}\! \left( A+B \right)\subset \mathrm{\Lambda}^{\!\otimes}\! \left( A \right) + \mathrm{\Lambda}^{\!\otimes}\! \left( B \right).$
3. For all $A\in \mathbb{M}_n$ and $\alpha\in \mathbb{C}$ $\mathrm{\Lambda}^{\!\otimes}\! \left( {A+\alpha \mathbf{I}} \right) =\mathrm{\Lambda}^{\!\otimes}\! \left( A\right)+\alpha.$
4. For all $A\in \mathbb{M}_n$ and $\alpha\in \mathbb{C}$ $\mathrm{\Lambda}^{\!\otimes}\! \left( {\alpha A} \right) =\alpha\mathrm{\Lambda}^{\!\otimes}\! \left( {A} \right).$
5. For all $A\in \mathbb{M}_{m\times n}$ $\mathrm{\Lambda}^{\!\otimes}\! \left( {(U\otimes V)A(U\otimes V)^\dagger} \right) = \mathrm{\Lambda}^{\!\otimes}\! \left( {A} \right),$ for unitary $U\in \mathbb{M}_m$ and $V\in \mathbb{M}_n$.
6. Let $A \in \mathbb{M}_m$ and $B\in \mathbb{M}_n$

- If one of them is normal then the numerical range of their tensor product coincides with the convex hull of the product numerical range, $\mathrm{\Lambda}(A \otimes B) = \mathrm{Co}(\mathrm{\Lambda}^{\!\otimes}\! \left( {A \otimes B}\right) ).$
- If $e^{i \theta} A$ is positive semidefinite for some $\theta \in[0,2 \pi)$, then $\mathrm{\Lambda}(A \otimes B) = \mathrm{\Lambda}^{\!\otimes}\! \left( {A \otimes B} \right).$
- Let $H(A)=\frac{1}{2}(A+A^\dagger)$ and $S(A)=\frac{1}{2}(A-A^\dagger)$.

1. For all $A\in \mathbb{M}_{n}$, we have $\mathrm{\Lambda}^{\!\otimes}\! \left( {H(A)} \right) =\mathrm{Re}\ \mathrm{\Lambda}^{\!\otimes}\! \left( {A} \right)$ and $\mathrm{\Lambda}^{\!\otimes}\! \left( {S(A)} \right) =i\,\mathrm{Im}\ \mathrm{\Lambda}^{\!\otimes}\! \left( {A} \right).$

=== Convexity ===
The product numerical range does not need to be convex. Consider the following simple example. Let

$$A=
\left(
\begin{array}{cc}
1 & 0\\
0 & 0
\end{array}
\right)
\otimes
\left(
\begin{array}{cc}
1 & 0\\
0 & 0
\end{array}
\right)
+ i
\left(
\begin{array}{cc}
0 & 0\\
0 & 1
\end{array}
\right)
\otimes
\left(
\begin{array}{cc}
0 & 0\\
0 & 1
\end{array}
\right).$$

Matrix $A$ defined above is matrix with eigenvalues $0,1,i$. It is easy to see that $1 \in \mathrm{\Lambda}^{\!\otimes}\! \left({A}\right)$ and $i \in \mathrm{\Lambda}^{\!\otimes}\! \left({A}\right)$, but $(1+i)/2 \not\in\mathrm{\Lambda}^{\!\otimes}\! \left({A}\right)$. Actually, by direct computation we have $\mathrm{\Lambda}^{\!\otimes}\! \left({A}\right) = \left\{ x+yi : 0\leq x, 0\leq y, \sqrt{x}+\sqrt{y}\leq 1\right\}.$

Product numerical range of matrix $A$ is presented below.

The comparison of the numerical range (gray triangle) and the product numerical range (dashed set) for matrix A.

Product numerical range forms a nonempty set for a general operator. In particular it contains the barycenter of the spectrum.

== Barycenter ==
Product numerical range of $A\in \mathbb{M}_{K\times M}$ includes the barycenter of the spectrum, $\frac{1}{KM}\; {\mathrm{tr}} A \ \in \ \mathrm{\Lambda}^{\!\otimes}\! \left({A}\right).$

Product numerical radius is a vector norm on matrices, but it is not a matrix norm. Product numerical radius is invariant with respect to local unitaries, which have the tensor product structure.
