= Courant minimax principle =

In mathematics, the Courant minimax principle gives the eigenvalues of a real symmetric matrix. It is named after Richard Courant.

== Introduction ==
The Courant minimax principle gives a condition for finding the eigenvalues for a real symmetric matrix. The Courant minimax principle is as follows:

For any real symmetric matrix A,

$$\lambda_k=\min\limits_C\max\limits_{{\| x\| =1}, {Cx=0}}\langle Ax,x\rangle,$$

where $C$ is any $(k-1)\times n$ matrix.

Notice that the vector x is an eigenvector to the corresponding eigenvalue λ.

The Courant minimax principle is a result of the maximum theorem, which says that for $q(x)=\langle Ax,x\rangle$, A being a real symmetric matrix, the largest eigenvalue is given by $\lambda_1 = \max_{\|x\|=1} q(x) = q(x_1)$, where $x_1$ is the corresponding eigenvector. Also (in the maximum theorem) subsequent eigenvalues $\lambda_k$ and eigenvectors $x_k$ are found by induction and orthogonal to each other; therefore, $\lambda_k =\max q(x_k)$ with $\langle x_j, x_k \rangle = 0, \ j<k$.

The Courant minimax principle, as well as the maximum principle, can be visualized by imagining that if ||x|| = 1 is a hypersphere then the matrix A deforms that hypersphere into an ellipsoid. When the major axis on the intersecting hyperplane are maximized — i.e., the length of the quadratic form q(x) is maximized — this is the eigenvector, and its length is the eigenvalue. All other eigenvectors will be perpendicular to this.

The minimax principle also generalizes to eigenvalues of positive self-adjoint operators on Hilbert spaces, where it is commonly used to study the Sturm–Liouville problem.

== See also ==
- Min-max theorem
- Max–min inequality
- Rayleigh quotient
