= Nelli Neumann =

German mathematician

- Born: 3 January 1886; Breslau, Silesia, Prussia
- Died: July 1942 (aged 56); Minsk Ghetto, Byelorussia
- Education: University of Breslau
- Scientific career
- Fields: Synthetic geometry
- Thesis: Über das Flächennetz 2. Ordnung und seine korrelative Beziehung auf einen Strahlenbündel (1909)
- Doctoral advisor: Rudolf Sturm

Nelli Neumann (3 January 1886 – July 1942) was a German mathematician who worked in synthetic geometry. She was one of the first women to obtain a doctorate in mathematics at a German university.

== Biography ==
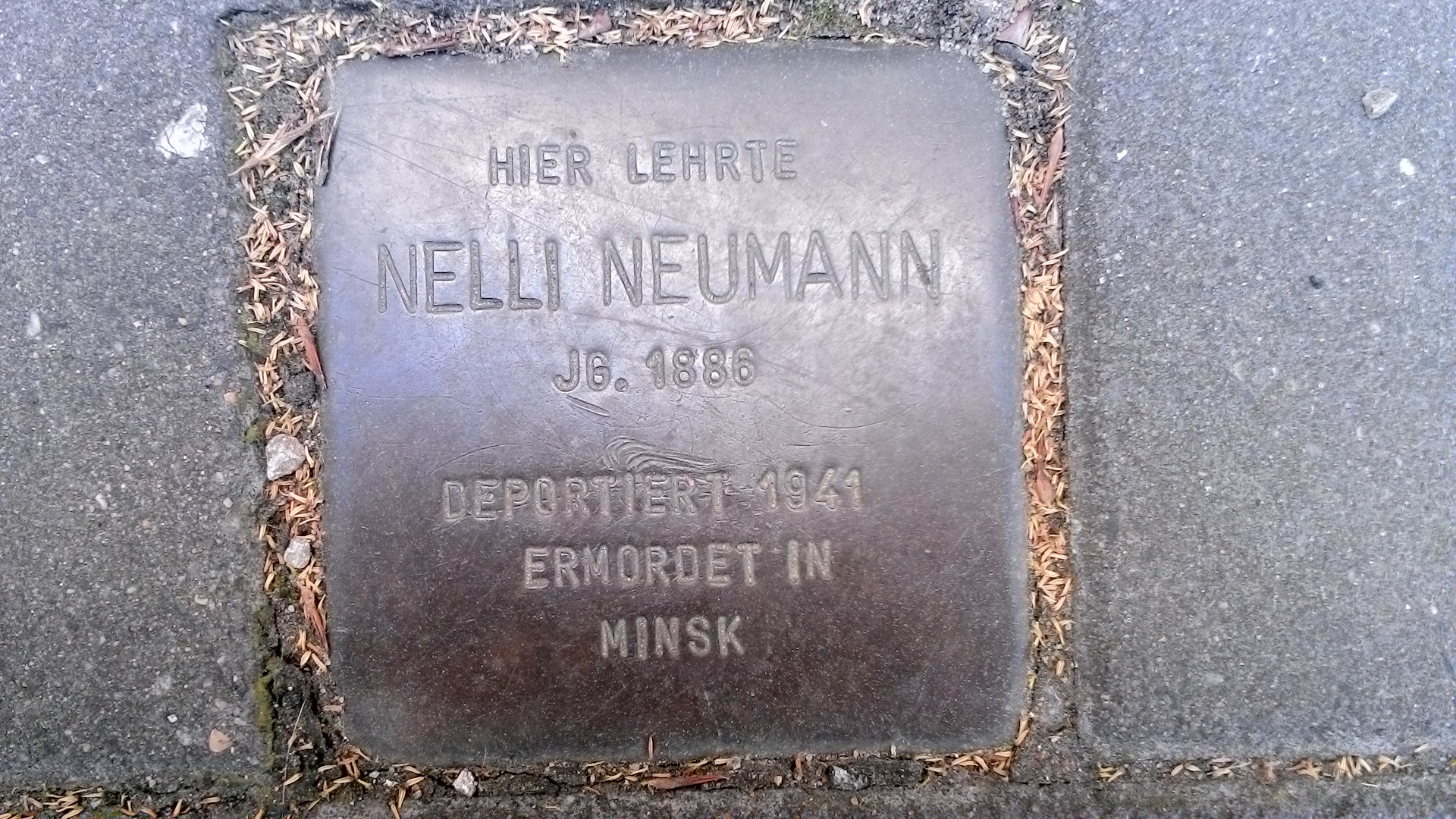
Stolperstein in Essen dedicated to Neumann.

Nelli Neumann was born in Breslau, Prussia, the only child of Jewish parents Max and Sophie Neumann. Her father was a judicial officer, while her mother died when she was only two years old. After ten years in the private Höhere Töchterschule in Breslau, Neumann attended grammar courses and graduated from the König-Wilhelm-Gymnasium boys' school in 1905. Her father promoted her mathematical talent by arranging private mathematics lessons given by Richard Courant. The two went on to study together at the Universities of Breslau and Zürich. Neumann would return to Breslau for her doctorate, for which she completed her thesis in 1909 under the supervision of Rudolf Sturm. After Courant received his post-doctoral degree at Göttingen University, they married in the summer of 1912.

Turning down a post-doctoral position at the University of Breslau, Neumann then took courses that qualified her to become a secondary school teacher. She also worked in the career counselling centre for female students at Göttingen, which had been set up by the Frauenbildung-Frauenstudium association.

Nelli's marriage became increasingly difficult, and she and Courant divorced on 16 February 1916. After the First World War, she moved to Essen, where she taught mathematics, physics, and chemistry at the Luisenschule. Soon after the Nazis took power, on 27 September 1933, she lost her position under the Law for the Restoration of the Professional Civil Service. She was deported to the Minsk Ghetto on 10 November 1941 and was executed there the following year.
