= Hamiltonian truncation =

Numerical method in quantum field theory

Hamiltonian truncation is a numerical method used to study quantum field theories (QFTs) in $d \geq 2$ spacetime dimensions. Hamiltonian truncation is an adaptation of the Rayleigh–Ritz method from quantum mechanics. It is closely related to the exact diagonalization method used to treat spin systems in condensed matter physics. The method is typically used to study QFTs on spacetimes of the form $\mathbb{R} \times M$, specifically to compute the spectrum of the Hamiltonian along $\mathbb{R}$. A key feature of Hamiltonian truncation is that an explicit ultraviolet cutoff $\Lambda$ is introduced, akin to the lattice spacing a in lattice Monte Carlo methods. Since Hamiltonian truncation is a nonperturbative method, it can be used to study strong-coupling phenomena like spontaneous symmetry breaking.

== Principles ==
=== Energy cutoff ===
Local quantum field theories can be defined on any manifold. Often, the spacetime of interest includes a copy of $\mathbb{R}$, like $\mathbb{R}^d$ (flat space), $\mathbb{R} \times S^{d-1}$ (an infinite hollow cylinder), $\mathbb{R} \times \mathbf{T}^{d-1}$ (space is taken to be a torus) or even Anti-de Sitter space in global coordinates. On such a manifold we can take time to run along $\mathbb{R}$, such that energies are conserved. Solving such a QFT amounts to finding the spectrum and eigenstates of the Hamiltonian H, which is difficult or impossible to do analytically. Hamiltonian truncation provides a strategy to compute the spectrum of H to arbitrary precision. The idea is that many QFT Hamiltonians can be written as the sum of "free" part $H_0$ and an "interacting" part that describes interactions (for example a $\phi^4$ term or a Yukawa coupling), schematically

$$H = H_0 + g V$$

where V can be written as the integral of a local operator $\mathcal{V}$ over M. There may be multiple interaction terms $g_1 V_1 + g_2 V_2 + \ldots$, but that case generalizes straightforwardly from the case with a single interaction $g V$. Hamiltonian truncation amounts to the following recipe:

1. Fix a UV cutoff $\Lambda$, and find all eigenstates $|i\rangle$ of $H_0$ with energy $e_i \leq \Lambda$. Normalize these eigenstates such that $\langle i | j \rangle = \delta_{ij}$. Let $N(\Lambda)$ be the number of low-energy states.
2. Compute the Hamiltonian explicitly restricted to these low-energy states. The result will be a matrix of size $N(\Lambda) \times N(\Lambda)$, explicitly $H(\Lambda)_{ij} = e_i \delta_{ij} + g V_{ij}$ with $V_{ij} = \langle i | V | j \rangle.$
3. Compute the energies and eigenstates of the finite matrix $H(\Lambda)$, obeying $H(\Lambda)| \psi_\alpha \rangle = E_\alpha(\Lambda) | \psi_\alpha \rangle$.

In a UV-finite quantum field theory, the resulting energies $E_\alpha(\Lambda)$ have a finite limit as the cutoff $\Lambda$ is taken to infinity, so at least in principle the exact spectrum of the Hamiltonian can be recovered. In practice the cutoff $\Lambda$ is always finite, and the procedure is performed on a computer.

The use of the term "Hamiltonian truncation" goes back to Refs.

=== Range of validity ===
For a given cutoff $\Lambda$, Hamiltonian truncation has a finite range of validity, meaning that cutoff errors become important when the coupling g is too large. To make this precise, let's take R to be the rough size of the manifold M, that is to say that

$$\text{vol}(M) \sim R^{d-1}$$

up to some c-number coefficient. If the deformation V is the integral of a local operator of dimension $\Delta$, then the coupling g will have mass dimension $[g] = d-\Delta$, so the redefined coupling

$$\bar{g} \equiv g R^{d-\Delta}$$

is dimensionless. Depending on the order of magnitude of $\bar{g}$, we can distinguish three different regimes:

- $\bar{g} \ll 1$: perturbation theory is valid. Generically, perturbation theory is either asymptotic or it converges up to some value $|\bar{g}| \leq \bar{g}_\text{max} = O(1)$. For infinitesimal values of $\bar{g}$, quantum effects can be neglected.
- $\bar{g} = O(\text{few})$: perturbation theory is no longer reliable, but the truncated energies $E_\alpha(\Lambda)$ provide a good approximation to their continuum values for reasonable values of the cutoff $\Lambda$.
- $\bar{g} \gg 1$: for very large values of $\bar{g}$ (or equivalently, when the volume of M becomes very large), Hamiltonian truncation only provides good results when the cutoff $\Lambda$ is taken to be astronomically large. In practice, this regime is not accessible. This is an avatar of the orthogonality catastrophe.

=== Truncation errors and ultraviolet divergences ===
There are two intrinsic but related issues with Hamiltonian truncation:

1. In some cases, the $E_\alpha(\Lambda)$ do not have a finite limit as $\Lambda \to \infty$.
2. Even when the continuum limit $\lim_{\Lambda \to \infty} E_\alpha(\Lambda)$ exists, we only have access to cutoff data $E_\alpha(\Lambda)$ for a range of finite values of the cutoff.

The first case is due to ultraviolet divergences of the quantum field theory in question. In this case, cutoff-dependent counterterms must be added to the Hamiltonian H in order to obtain a physically meaningful result. In order to understand the second problem, one can perform perturbative computations to understand the continuum limit analytically.

Let us spell this out using an example. We have in mind a perturbation of the form gV with

$$V = \int_M d{\mathbf x} \; \mathcal{V}(t=0,{\mathbf x})$$

where $\mathcal{V}(t,\mathbf x)$ is a local operator. Suppose that we want to compute the first corrections to the vacuum energy due to V. In Rayleigh–Schrödinger perturbation theory, we know that

$$E_\Omega(\Lambda) = 0 + g \langle \Omega | V | \Omega \rangle + g^2 E_\Omega^{(2)}(\Lambda) + O(g^3)$$

where

$$E_\Omega^{(2)}(\Lambda) = - \int_0^\Lambda \frac{dE}{E}\; \rho_{\Omega}(E),
\quad
\rho_\Omega(E) = \sum_i \delta(E-e_i) |\langle i | V | \Omega \rangle|^2 \geq 0$$

where the sum runs over all states $|i\rangle$ other than the vacuum $|\Omega \rangle$ itself. Whether this integral converges or not depends on the large-E behavior of the spectral density $\rho_\Omega(E)$. In turn, this depends on the short-distance behavior of the two-point correlation function of the operator $\mathcal{V}$. Indeed, we can write

$$\int_0^\infty dE\, e^{-E t}\rho_\Omega(E) = \int_M d{\mathbf x}\int_Md{\mathbf y} \, \left[ \langle \Omega | \mathcal{V}(t,\mathbf x)\mathcal{V}(0,\mathbf y) | \Omega \rangle - \langle \Omega | \mathcal{V}(0,\mathbf x) | \Omega \rangle \langle \Omega | \mathcal{V}(0,\mathbf y) | \Omega \rangle \right]$$

where $\mathcal{V}(t,\mathbf x) = e^{H_0 t} \mathcal{V}(0,\mathbf x) e^{-H_0 t}$ evolves in Euclidean time in the interaction picture. Hence the large-E behavior of the spectral density encodes the short-time behavior of the $\langle \mathcal{V}(t,\mathbf x)\mathcal{V}(0,\mathbf y) \rangle$ vacuum correlator, where both x,y are integrated over space. The large-E scaling can be computed in explicit theories; in general it goes as

$$\rho_\Omega(E) \mathrel{\mathop{\sim}\limits_{\scriptstyle{E \to \infty}}} c \cdot E^{2\Delta_\mathcal{V} - d}$$

where $\Delta_\mathcal{V}$ is the scaling or mass dimension of the operator $\mathcal{V}$ and c is some constant. There are now two possibilities, depending on the value of $\gamma \equiv d - 2\Delta_\mathcal{V}$:

- If $\gamma \leq 0$, the truncated Casimir energy $E_\Omega(\Lambda)$ diverges in the continuum limit. In this case, a cutoff-dependent counterterm must be added to H in order to cancel this divergence.
- If $\gamma > 0$, the truncated Casimir energy converges as $\Lambda \to \infty$. The truncation error can be estimated to be

$$\qquad E_\Omega(\infty) - E_\Omega(\Lambda) \approx -g^2 \frac{c}{\gamma} \Lambda^{-\gamma} + O(g^3).$$

A similar analysis applies to cutoff errors in excited states and at higher orders in perturbation theory.

== Example of the massive scalar φ^{4} theory ==
=== Quantization ===
As an example, we can consider a massive scalar field $\phi(t,\mathbf{x})$ on some spacetime $\mathbb{R} \times M$, where M is compact (possibly having a boundary). The total metric can be written as

$$ds^2 = -dt^2 + h_{ij}({\mathbf x}) dx^i dx^j.$$

Let's consider the action

$$S = \int_\mathbb{R} dt \int_M \sqrt{h}d\mathbf{x}\, \mathcal{L},
\quad
\mathcal{L} = - \frac{1}{2} \phi \triangle \phi + \frac{1}{2} m^2 \phi^2 + g \phi^4$$

where $\triangle$ is the Laplacian on $\mathbb{R} \times M$. The g=0 theory can be canonically quantized, which endows the field $\phi$ with a mode decomposition

$$\phi(t,\mathbf{x}) = \sum_{n \in \mathbb{N}} \frac{1}{\sqrt{2\omega_n}} \left(a_n \, e^{-i\omega_n t} f_n(\mathbf{x}) + a_n^\dagger \, e^{i\omega_n t} f_n(\mathbf{x})^*\right)$$

where the creation and annihilation operators obey canonical commutation relations $[a_m,a_n^\dagger] = \delta_{mn}$. The single-particle energies $\omega_n > 0$ and the mode functions $f_n(\mathbf{x})$ depend on the spatial manifold M. The Hamiltonian at t=0 is then given by

$$H = H_0 + gV,
\quad
H_0 = \sum_{n \in \mathbb{N}} \omega_n a_n^\dagger a_n
\quad
\text{and}
\quad
V = \int_M \sqrt{h} d\mathbf{x}\; \phi(t=0,\mathbf{x})^4.$$

=== Hamiltonian truncation ===
The Hilbert space of the $g=0$ theory is the Fock space of the modes $\{a_n^\dagger\}$. That is to say that there exists a vacuum state $|\Omega \rangle$ obeying $a_n | \Omega \rangle = 0$ for all n, and on top of that there are single- and multi-particle states. Explicitly, a general eigenstate of $H_0$ is labeled by a tuple $\{k_n\}$ of occupation numbers:

$$| {\mathbf k} \rangle = \prod_{n \in \mathbb{N}} \frac{1}{\sqrt{k_n!}} (a_n^\dagger)^{k_n} | \Omega \rangle$$

where the $k_n$ can take values in the integers: $k_n \in \{ 0,1,2,\ldots\}$. Such a state has energy

$$H_0 |{\mathbf k} \rangle = e({\mathbf k}) | {\mathbf k} \rangle,
\quad
e({\mathbf k}) = \sum_{n \in \mathbb{N}} k_n \omega_n$$

so finding a basis of low-energy states amounts to finding all tuples $\{k_n\}$ obeying $e(\mathbf k) \leq \Lambda$. Let's denote all such states schematically as $|i\rangle$. Next, the matrix elements $V_{ij}$ can be computed explicitly using the canonical commutation relations. Finally, the explicit Hamiltonian $H(\Lambda)_{ij} = e_i \delta_{ij} + g V_{ij}$ has to be diagonalized.

The resulting spectra can be used to study precision physics. Depending on the values of g and $m^2$, the above $\phi^4$ theory can be in a symmetry-preserving or a symmetry-broken phase, which can be studied explicitly using the above algorithm. The continuous phase transition between these two phases can also be analyzed, in which case the spectrum and eigenstates of H contain information about the conformal field theory of the Ising universality class.

== Special cases ==
=== Truncated Conformal Space Approach ===
The truncated conformal space approach (TCSA) is a version of the Hamiltonian truncation that applies to perturbed conformal field theories. This approach was introduced by Yurov and Al. Zamolodchikov in 1990 and has become a standard ingredient used to study two-dimensional QFTs. The d-dimensional version of TCSA was first studied in 2014.

A RG flow emanating from a conformal field theory (CFT) is described by an action

$$S = S_\text{CFT} + g \int d^d x\, \mathcal{V}(x)$$

where $\mathcal{V}$ is a scalar operator in the CFT of scaling dimension $\Delta_\mathcal{V} \leq d$. At large distances, such theories are strongly coupled. It is convenient to study such RG flows on the cylinder $\mathbb{R} \times S^{d-1}$, taking the sphere to have radius R and endowing the full space with coordinates $(t,\mathbf{n})$. The reason is that the unperturbed (g=0) theory admits a simple description owing to radial quantization. Schematically, states $|i\rangle$ on the cylinder are in one-to-one correspondence with local operators $\mathcal{O}_i$ inserted at the origin of flat space:

$$|i\rangle = \lim_{x \to 0} \mathcal{O}_i(x) | \Omega \rangle$$

where $|\Omega\rangle$ is the CFT vacuum state. The Hamiltonian on the cylinder is precisely the dilatation operator D of the CFT: the unperturbed energies are given by

$$H_0 | i \rangle = \frac{\Delta_i}{R} | i \rangle$$

where $\Delta_i$ is the scaling dimension of the operator $\mathcal{O}_i$. Finally, the matrix elements of the deformation V

$$V_{ij} = R^{d-1} \int_{S^{d-1}} d\mathbf{n}\; \langle i | \mathcal{V}(t=0,\mathbf{n}) | j \rangle$$

are proportional to OPE coefficients $\mathcal{V} \times \mathcal{O}_j \sim \mathcal{O}_i$ in the original CFT.

=== Lightcone truncation methods ===
Real-time QFTs are often studied in lightcone coordinates

$$ds^2 = 2dx^{+}dx^{-} - (dx^i)^2.$$

Although the spectrum of the lightcone Hamiltonian $P_{+} = i \partial/\partial x^{+}$ is continuous, it is still possible to compute certain observables using truncation methods. The most commonly used scheme, used when the UV theory is conformal, is known as lightcone conformal truncation (LCT). Notably, the spatial manifold M is non-compact in this case, unlike the equal-time quantization described previously. See also the page for light-front computational methods, which describes related computational setups.

== Numerical implementation ==
Hamiltonian truncation computations are normally performed using a computer algebra system, or a programming language like Python or C++.

The number of low-energy states $N(\Lambda)$ tends to grow rapidly with the UV cutoff, and it is common to perform Hamiltonian truncation computations taking into account several thousand states. Nonetheless, one is often only interested in the first O(10) energies and eigenstates of H. Instead of diagonalizing the full Hamiltonian explicitly (which is numerically very costly), approximation methods like Arnoldi iteration and the Lanczos algorithm are commonly used.

In some cases, it is not possible to orthonormalize the low-energy states $|i\rangle$, either because this is numerically expensive or because the underlying Hilbert space is not positive definite. In that case, one has to solve the generalized eigenvalue problem

$$H_{ij}(\Lambda) v_\alpha^j = E_\alpha(\Lambda) \, G_{ij}  v_\alpha^j$$

where $H_{ij}(\Lambda) = \langle i | H(\Lambda) | j \rangle$ and $G_{ij} = \langle i | j \rangle$ is the Gram matrix of the theory. In this formulation, the eigenstates of the truncated Hamiltonian are $|\psi_\alpha \rangle = v_\alpha^i | i \rangle$.

In practice, it is important to keep track of the symmetries of the theory, that is to say all generators $G_i$ that satisfy $[G_i,H(\Lambda)] = 0$. There are two types of symmetries in Hamiltonian truncation:

1. Global symmetries, for instance the $\mathbb{Z}_2$ symmetry $\phi \mapsto -\phi$ in $\phi^4$ theory.
2. Symmetries of the spatial manifold M, for instance the orthogonal group $O(d)$ when $M = S^{d-1}$.

When all states are organized in symmetry sectors with respect to the $G_i$ the Hamiltonian is block diagonal, so the effort required to diagonalize H is reduced.
