= Min-max theorem =

Theorem in functional analysis

In linear algebra and functional analysis, the min-max theorem, or variational theorem, or Courant–Fischer–Weyl min-max principle, is a result that gives a variational characterization of eigenvalues of compact Hermitian operators on Hilbert spaces. It can be viewed as the starting point of many results of similar nature.

This article first discusses the finite-dimensional case and its applications before considering compact operators on infinite-dimensional Hilbert spaces. For compact operators, the proof of the main theorem uses essentially the same idea from the finite-dimensional argument.

In the case that the operator is non-Hermitian, the theorem provides an equivalent characterization of the associated singular values. The min-max theorem can be extended to self-adjoint operators that are bounded below.

== Matrices ==
Let A be a n × n Hermitian matrix. As with many other variational results on eigenvalues, one considers the Rayleigh–Ritz quotient R_{A} : C^{n} \ {0} → R defined by

$$R_A(x) = \frac{(Ax, x)}{(x,x)}$$

where (⋅, ⋅) denotes the Euclidean inner product on C^{n}.

The Rayleigh quotient of an eigenvector $v$ is its associated eigenvalue $\lambda$ because $R_A(v) = (\lambda x, x)/(x, x) = \lambda$. For a Hermitian matrix A, the range of the continuous functions R_{A}(x) is a compact interval [a, b] of the real line. The maximum b and the minimum a are the largest and smallest eigenvalue of A, respectively. The min-max theorem is a refinement of this fact.

=== Min-max theorem ===
Let $A$ be Hermitian on an inner product space $V$ with dimension $n$, with spectrum ordered in descending order $\lambda_1 \geq ... \geq \lambda_n$.

Let $v_1, ..., v_n$ be the corresponding unit-length orthogonal eigenvectors.

Reverse the spectrum ordering, so that $\xi_1 = \lambda_n, ..., \xi_n = \lambda_1$.

(Poincaré’s inequality)—Let $M$ be a subspace of $V$ with dimension $k$, then there exists unit vectors $x, y\in M$, such that

$\langle x, Ax\rangle\leq \lambda_k$, and $\langle y, Ay\rangle \geq \xi_k$.

Proof

Part 2 is a corollary, using $-A$.

$M$ is a $k$ dimensional subspace, so if we pick any list of $n-k+1$ linearly independent vectors, their span $N := span(v_k, ... v_n)$ must intersect $M$ on at least a single line.

Take unit $x \in M\cap N$. That’s what we need.

$x = \sum_{i=k}^n a_i v_i$, since $x\in N$.

Since $\sum_{i=k}^n |a_i|^2 = 1$, we find $\langle x,Ax \rangle = \sum_{i=k}^n |a_i|^2\lambda_i \leq \lambda_k$.

min-max theorem—
$$\begin{aligned}
\lambda_k &=\max _{\begin{array}{c} \mathcal{M} \subset V \\ \operatorname{dim}(\mathcal{M})=k \end{array}} \min _{\begin{array}{c} x \in \mathcal{M} \\ \|x\|=1 \end{array}}\langle x, A x\rangle\\
&=\min _{\begin{array}{c} \mathcal{M} \subset V \\ \operatorname{dim}(\mathcal{M})=n-k+1 \end{array}} \max _{\begin{array}{c} x \in \mathcal{M} \\ \|x\|=1 \end{array}}\langle x, A x\rangle \text{. }
\end{aligned}$$

Proof

Part 2 is a corollary of part 1, by using $-A$.

By Poincare’s inequality, $\lambda_k$ is an upper bound to the right side.

By setting $\mathcal M = span(v_1, ... v_k)$, the upper bound is achieved.

Define the partial trace $tr_V(A)$ to be the trace of projection of $A$ to $V$. It is equal to $\sum_i v_i^*Av_i$ given an orthonormal basis of $V$.

Wielandt minimax formula —Let $1 \leq i_1<\cdots<i_k \leq n$ be integers. Define a partial flag to be a nested collection $V_1 \subset \cdots \subset V_k$ of subspaces of $\mathbb{C}^n$ such that $\operatorname{dim}\left(V_j\right)=i_j$ for all $1 \leq j \leq k$.

Define the associated Schubert variety $X\left(V_1, \ldots, V_k\right)$ to be the collection of all $k$ dimensional subspaces $W$ such that $\operatorname{dim}\left(W \cap V_j\right) \geq j$.

$$\lambda_{i_1}(A)+\cdots+\lambda_{i_k}(A)=\sup _{V_1, \ldots, V_k} \inf_{W \in X\left(V_1, \ldots, V_k\right)} tr_W(A)$$

Proof

The $\leq$ case.

Let $V_{j} = span(e_1, \dots, e_{i_j})$, and any $W \in X\left(V_1, \ldots, V_k\right)$, it remains to show that
$$\lambda_{i_1}(A)+\cdots+\lambda_{i_k}(A) \leq  tr_W(A)$$

To show this, we construct an orthonormal set of vectors $v_1, \dots, v_k$ such that $v_j \in V_j \cap W$. Then $tr_W(A) \geq \sum_j \langle v_j, Av_j\rangle \geq \lambda_{i_j}(A)$

Since $dim(V_1 \cap W) \geq 1$, we pick any unit $v_1 \in V_1 \cap W$. Next, since $dim(V_2 \cap W) \geq 2$, we pick any unit $v_2 \in (V_2 \cap W)$ that is perpendicular to $v_1$, and so on.

The $\geq$ case.

For any such sequence of subspaces $V_i$, we must find some $W \in X\left(V_1, \ldots, V_k\right)$ such that
$$\lambda_{i_1}(A)+\cdots+\lambda_{i_k}(A) \geq tr_W(A)$$

Now we prove this by induction.

The $n=1$ case is the Courant-Fischer theorem. Assume now $n \geq 2$.

If $i_1 \geq 2$, then we can apply induction. Let $E = span(e_{i_1}, \dots, e_n)$. We construct a partial flag within $E$ from the intersection of $E$ with $V_1, \dots, V_k$.

We begin by picking a $(i_k-(i_1-1))$-dimensional subspace $W_k' \subset E \cap V_{i_k}$, which exists by counting dimensions. This has codimension $(i_1-1)$ within $V_{i_k}$.

Then we go down by one space, to pick a $(i_{k-1} - (i_1 - 1))$-dimensional subspace $W_{k-1}' \subset W_k \cap V_{i_{k-1}}$. This still exists. Etc. Now since $dim(E) \leq n-1$, apply the induction hypothesis, there exists some $W \in X(W_1, \dots, W_k)$ such that
$$\lambda_{i_1 - (i_1-1)}(A|E)+\cdots+\lambda_{i_k- (i_1-1)}(A|E) \geq tr_W(A)$$
Now $\lambda_{i_j - (i_1-1)}(A|E)$ is the $(i_j-(i_1-1))$-th eigenvalue of $A$ orthogonally projected down to $E$. By Cauchy interlacing theorem, $\lambda_{i_j - (i_1-1)}(A|E) \leq \lambda_{i_j}(A)$. Since $X(W_1, \dots, W_k)\subset X(V_1, \dots, V_k)$, we’re done.

If $i_1 = 1$, then we perform a similar construction. Let $E = span(e_{2}, \dots, e_n)$. If $V_k \subset E$, then we can induct. Otherwise, we construct a partial flag sequence $W_2, \dots, W_k$ By induction, there exists some $W' \in X(W_2, \dots, W_k)\subset X(V_2, \dots, V_k)$, such that
$$\lambda_{i_2-1}(A|E)+\cdots+\lambda_{i_k-1}(A|E) \geq tr_{W'}(A)$$
thus
$$\lambda_{i_2}(A)+\cdots+\lambda_{i_k}(A) \geq tr_{W'}(A)$$
And it remains to find some $v$ such that $W' \oplus v \in X(V_1, \dots, V_k)$.

If $V_1 \not\subset W'$, then any $v \in V_1 \setminus W'$ would work. Otherwise, if $V_2 \not\subset W'$, then any $v \in V_2 \setminus W'$ would work, and so on. If none of these work, then it means $V_k \subset E$, contradiction.

This has some corollaries:

Extremal partial trace—
$$\lambda_1(A)+\dots+\lambda_k(A)=\sup_{\operatorname{dim}(V)=k }tr_V(A)$$

$$\xi_1(A)+\dots+\xi_k(A)=\inf_{\operatorname{dim}(V)=k }tr_V(A)$$

Corollary—The sum $\lambda_1(A)+\dots+\lambda_k(A)$ is a convex function, and $\xi_1(A)+\dots+\xi_k(A)$ is concave.

(Schur-Horn inequality)
$$\xi_1(A)+\dots+\xi_k(A) \leq a_{i_1,i_1} + \dots + a_{i_k,i_k} \leq \lambda_1(A)+\dots+\lambda_k(A)$$
for any subset of indices.

Equivalently, this states that the diagonal vector of $A$ is majorized by its eigenspectrum.

Schatten-norm Hölder inequality—Given Hermitian $A, B$ and Hölder pair $1/p + 1/q = 1$,
$$|\operatorname{tr}(A B)| \leq\|A\|_{S^p}\|B\|_{S^q}$$

Proof

WLOG, $B$ is diagonalized, then we need to show $|\sum_i B_{ii} A_{ii} | \leq \|A \|_{S^p} \|(B_{ii})\|_{l^q}$

By the standard Hölder inequality, it suffices to show $\|(A_{ii})\|_{l^p}\leq \|A \|_{S^p}$

By the Schur-Horn inequality, the diagonals of $A$ are majorized by the eigenspectrum of $A$, and since the map $f(x_1, \dots, x_n) = \|x\|_p$ is symmetric and convex, it is Schur-convex.

=== Counterexample in the non-Hermitian case ===
Let N be the nilpotent matrix

$$\begin{bmatrix} 0 & 1 \\ 0 & 0 \end{bmatrix}.$$

Define the Rayleigh quotient $R_N(x)$ exactly as above in the Hermitian case. Then it is easy to see that the only eigenvalue of N is zero, while the maximum value of the Rayleigh quotient is 1/2. That is, the maximum value of the Rayleigh quotient is larger than the maximum eigenvalue.

== Applications ==
=== Min-max principle for singular values ===
The singular values {σ_{k}} of a square matrix M are the square roots of the eigenvalues of M*M (equivalently MM*). An immediate consequence of the first equality in the min-max theorem is:

$$\sigma_k^{\downarrow} = \max_{S:\dim(S)=k} \min_{x \in S, \|x\| = 1} (M^* Mx, x)^{\frac{1}{2}}=\max_{S:\dim(S)=k} \min_{x \in S, \|x\| = 1} \| Mx \|.$$

Similarly,

$$\sigma_k^{\downarrow} = \min_{S:\dim(S)=n-k+1} \max_{x \in S, \|x\| = 1} \| Mx \|.$$

Here $\sigma_k^{\downarrow}$ denotes the k^{th} entry in the decreasing sequence of the singular values, so that $\sigma_1^{\downarrow} \geq \sigma_2^{\downarrow} \geq \cdots$.

=== Cauchy interlacing theorem ===
Let A be a symmetric n × n matrix. The m × m matrix B, where m ≤ n, is called a compression of A if there exists an orthogonal projection P onto a subspace of dimension m such that PAP* = B. The Cauchy interlacing theorem states:

Theorem. If the eigenvalues of A are α_{1} ≤ ... ≤ α_{n}, and those of B are β_{1} ≤ ... ≤ β_{j} ≤ ... ≤ β_{m}, then for all j ≤ m,

$$\alpha_j \leq \beta_j \leq \alpha_{n-m+j}.$$

This can be proven using the min-max principle. Let β_{i} have corresponding eigenvector b_{i} and S_{j} be the j dimensional subspace S_{j} = span{b_{1}, ..., b_{j}}, then

$$\beta_j = \max_{x \in S_j, \|x\| = 1} (Bx, x) = \max_{x \in S_j, \|x\| = 1} (PAP^*x, x) \geq \min_{S_j} \max_{x \in
S_j, \|x\| = 1} (A(P^*x), P^*x) = \alpha_j.$$

According to first part of min-max, α_{j} ≤ β_{j}. On the other hand, if we define S_{m−j+1} = span{b_{j}, ..., b_{m}}, then

$$\beta_j = \min_{x \in S_{m-j+1}, \|x\| = 1} (Bx, x) = \min_{x \in S_{m-j+1}, \|x\| = 1} (PAP^*x, x)= \min_{x \in S_{m-j+1}, \|x\| = 1} (A(P^*x), P^*x) \leq \alpha_{n-m+j},$$

where the last inequality is given by the second part of min-max.

When n − m = 1, we have α_{j} ≤ β_{j} ≤ α_{j+1}, hence the name interlacing theorem.

=== Lidskii's inequality ===
Lidskii inequality—If $1 \leq i_1<\cdots<i_k \leq n$ then
$$\begin{aligned}
& \lambda_{i_1}(A+B)+\cdots+\lambda_{i_k}(A+B) \\
& \quad \leq \lambda_{i_1}(A)+\cdots+\lambda_{i_k}(A)+\lambda_1(B)+\cdots+\lambda_k(B)
\end{aligned}$$

$$\begin{aligned}
& \lambda_{i_1}(A+B)+\cdots+\lambda_{i_k}(A+B) \\
& \quad \geq \lambda_{i_1}(A)+\cdots+\lambda_{i_k}(A)+\xi_1(B)+\cdots+\xi_k(B)
\end{aligned}$$

Proof

The second is the negative of the first. The first is by Wielandt minimax.

$$\begin{aligned}
& \lambda_{i_1}(A+B)+\cdots+\lambda_{i_k}(A+B) \\
=& \sup_{V_1, \dots, V_k} \inf_{W\in X(V_1, \dots, V_k)}(tr_W(A) + tr_W(B)) \\
=& \sup_{V_1, \dots, V_k} ( \inf_{W\in X(V_1, \dots, V_k)} tr_W(A) + tr_W(B)) \\
\leq& \sup_{V_1, \dots, V_k} ( \inf_{W\in X(V_1, \dots, V_k)} tr_W(A) + (\lambda_1(B)+\cdots+\lambda_k(B))) \\
=& \lambda_{i_1}(A)+\cdots+\lambda_{i_k}(A)+\lambda_1(B)+\cdots+\lambda_k(B)
\end{aligned}$$

Note that $\sum_i \lambda_i(A+B) = tr(A+B) = \sum_i \lambda_i(A) + \lambda_i(B)$. In other words, $\lambda(A+B) - \lambda(A) \preceq \lambda(B)$ where $\preceq$ means majorization. By the Schur convexity theorem, we then have

p-Wielandt-Hoffman inequality—$\|\lambda(A+B) - \lambda(A)\|_{\ell^p} \leq \|B\|_{S^p}$ where $\|\cdot\|_{S^p}$ stands for the p-Schatten norm.

== Compact operators ==
Let A be a compact, Hermitian operator on a Hilbert space H. Recall that the non-zero spectrum of such an operator consists of real eigenvalues with finite multiplicities whose only possible cluster point is zero. If A has infinitely many positive eigenvalues, they accumulate at zero. In this case, we list the positive eigenvalues of A as

$$\cdots \le \lambda_k \le \cdots \le \lambda_1,$$

where entries are repeated with multiplicity, as in the matrix case. (To emphasize that the sequence is decreasing, we may write $\lambda_k = \lambda_k^\downarrow$.) We now apply the same reasoning as in the matrix case. Letting S_{k} ⊂ H be a k dimensional subspace, we can obtain the following theorem.

Theorem (Min-Max). Let A be a compact, self-adjoint operator on a Hilbert space H, whose positive eigenvalues are listed in decreasing order ... ≤ λ_{k} ≤ ... ≤ λ_{1}. Then:

$$\begin{align}
\max_{S_k} \min_{x \in S_k, \|x\| = 1} (Ax,x) &= \lambda_k ^{\downarrow}, \\
\min_{S_{k-1}} \max_{x \in S_{k-1}^{\perp}, \|x\|=1} (Ax, x) &= \lambda_k^{\downarrow}.
\end{align}$$

A similar pair of equalities hold for negative eigenvalues.

Proof

Let S' be the closure of the linear span $S' =\operatorname{span}\{u_k,u_{k+1},\ldots\}$. The subspace S' has codimension k − 1. By the same dimension count argument as in the matrix case, S' ∩ S_{k} has positive dimension. So there exists x ∈ S' ∩ S_{k} with $\|x\|=1$. Since it is an element of S' , such an x necessarily satisfy

$$(Ax, x) \le \lambda_k.$$

Therefore, for all S_{k}

$$\inf_{x \in S_k, \|x\| = 1}(Ax,x) \le \lambda_k$$

But A is compact, therefore the function f(x) = (Ax, x) is weakly continuous. Furthermore, any bounded set in H is weakly compact. This lets us replace the infimum by minimum:

$$\min_{x \in S_k, \|x\| = 1}(Ax,x) \le \lambda_k.$$

So

$$\sup_{S_k} \min_{x \in S_k, \|x\| = 1}(Ax,x) \le \lambda_k.$$

Because equality is achieved when $S_k=\operatorname{span}\{u_1,\ldots,u_k\}$,

$$\max_{S_k} \min_{x \in S_k, \|x\| = 1}(Ax,x) = \lambda_k.$$

This is the first part of min-max theorem for compact self-adjoint operators.

Analogously, consider now a (k − 1)-dimensional subspace S_{k−1}, whose the orthogonal complement is denoted by S_{k−1}^{⊥}. If S' = span{u_{1}...u_{k}},

$$S' \cap S_{k-1}^{\perp} \ne {0}.$$

So

$$\exists x \in S_{k-1}^{\perp} \, \|x\| = 1, (Ax, x) \ge \lambda_k.$$

This implies

$$\max_{x \in S_{k-1}^{\perp}, \|x\| = 1} (Ax, x) \ge \lambda_k$$

where the compactness of A was applied. Index the above by the collection of k-1-dimensional subspaces gives

$$\inf_{S_{k-1}} \max_{x \in S_{k-1}^{\perp}, \|x\|=1} (Ax, x) \ge \lambda_k.$$

Pick S_{k−1} = span{u_{1}, ..., u_{k−1}} and we deduce

$$\min_{S_{k-1}} \max_{x \in S_{k-1}^{\perp}, \|x\|=1} (Ax, x) = \lambda_k.$$

== Self-adjoint operators ==
The min-max theorem also applies to (possibly unbounded) self-adjoint operators. Recall the essential spectrum is the spectrum without isolated eigenvalues of finite multiplicity. Sometimes we have some eigenvalues below the essential spectrum, and we would like to approximate the eigenvalues and eigenfunctions.

Theorem (Min-Max). Let A be self-adjoint, and let $E_1\le E_2\le E_3\le\cdots$ be the eigenvalues of A below the essential spectrum. Then

$E_n=\min_{\psi_1,\ldots,\psi_{n}}\max\{\langle\psi,A\psi\rangle:\psi\in\operatorname{span}(\psi_1,\ldots,\psi_{n}), \, \| \psi \| = 1\}$.

If we only have N eigenvalues and hence run out of eigenvalues, then we let $E_n:=\inf\sigma_{ess}(A)$ (the bottom of the essential spectrum) for n>N, and the above statement holds after replacing min-max with inf-sup.

Theorem (Max-Min). Let A be self-adjoint, and let $E_1\le E_2\le E_3\le\cdots$ be the eigenvalues of A below the essential spectrum. Then

$E_n=\max_{\psi_1,\ldots,\psi_{n-1}}\min\{\langle\psi,A\psi\rangle:\psi\perp\psi_1,\ldots,\psi_{n-1}, \, \| \psi \| = 1\}$.

If we only have N eigenvalues and hence run out of eigenvalues, then we let $E_n:=\inf\sigma_{ess}(A)$ (the bottom of the essential spectrum) for n > N, and the above statement holds after replacing max-min with sup-inf.

The proofs use the following results about self-adjoint operators:

Theorem. Let A be self-adjoint. Then $(A-E)\ge0$ for $E\in\mathbb{R}$ if and only if $\sigma(A)\subseteq[E,\infty)$.

Theorem. If A is self-adjoint, then

$\inf\sigma(A)=\inf_{\psi\in\mathfrak{D}(A),\|\psi\|=1}\langle\psi,A\psi\rangle$

and

$\sup\sigma(A)=\sup_{\psi\in\mathfrak{D}(A),\|\psi\|=1}\langle\psi,A\psi\rangle$.

== See also ==
- Courant minimax principle
- Max–min inequality

== External links and citations to related work ==
- Fisk, Steve (2005). "A very short proof of Cauchy's interlace theorem for eigenvalues of Hermitian matrices". arXiv:math/0502408.
- Hwang, Suk-Geun (2004). "Cauchy's Interlace Theorem for Eigenvalues of Hermitian Matrices". The American Mathematical Monthly. 111 (2): 157–159. doi:10.2307/4145217. JSTOR 4145217.
- Kline, Jeffery (2020). "Bordered Hermitian matrices and sums of the Möbius function". Linear Algebra and Its Applications. 588: 224–237. doi:10.1016/j.laa.2019.12.004.
- Reed, Michael; Simon, Barry (1978). Methods of Modern Mathematical Physics IV: Analysis of Operators. Academic Press. ISBN 978-0-08-057045-7.
- Edmunds, D. E.; Evans, W. D. (2018). "11.1 The Max–Min Principle for Semi-Bounded, Self-Adjoint Operators". Spectral theory and differential operators. Oxford science publications (2 ed.). Oxford: Oxford University Press. ISBN 978-0-19-881205-0.
