= Richard Courant =

German-American mathematician (1888–1972)

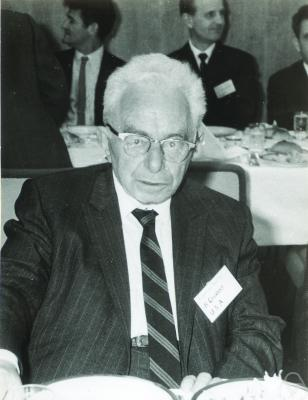
- Courant in 1969
- Born: January 8, 1888: Lublinitz, German Empire; (now Lubliniec, Poland)
- Died: January 27, 1972 (aged 84); New Rochelle, New York, U.S.
- Education: University of Zurich; University of Göttingen
- Known for: Courant number; Courant minimax principle; Courant–Friedrichs–Lewy condition; Courant's nodal domain theorem; Methoden der mathematischen Physik
- Scientific career
- Fields: Mathematics
- Workplaces: University of Göttingen; University of Münster; University of Cambridge; New York University
- Thesis: On the application of Dirichlet's principle to the problems of conformal mapping (1910)
- Doctoral advisor: David Hilbert
- Doctoral students: Leifur Ásgeirsson; Herbert Busemann; William Feller; Kurt Friedrichs; Harold Grad; Fritz John; Joseph Keller; Edgar Krahn; Martin Kruskal; Anneli Lax; Hans Lewy; Otto Neugebauer; Franz Rellich

Richard Courant (German: [ˈkuːʁant]; January 8, 1888 – January 27, 1972) was a German-American mathematician. He is best known by the general public for the book What is Mathematics?, co-written with Herbert Robbins. His research focused on the areas of real analysis, mathematical physics, the calculus of variations and partial differential equations. He wrote textbooks widely used by generations of students of physics and mathematics. He is also known for founding the institute now bearing his name at New York University.

== Biography ==
Courant was born in Lublinitz, in the Prussian Province of Silesia (now in Poland). His parents were Siegmund Courant and Martha Freund of Oels. Edith Stein was Richard's cousin on the maternal side. During his youth his parents moved often, including to Glatz, then to Breslau and in 1905 to Berlin. He stayed in Breslau and entered the university there, then continued his studies at the University of Zürich and the University of Göttingen. He became David Hilbert's assistant in Göttingen and obtained his doctorate there in 1910. He was obliged to serve in World War I, but was wounded shortly after enlisting and therefore dismissed from the military. Courant left the University of Münster in 1921 to take over Erich Hecke's position at the University of Göttingen. There he founded the Mathematical Institute, which he headed as director from 1928 until 1933.

Courant left Germany in 1933, earlier than many Jewish escapees. He did not lose his position due to being Jewish, as his previous service as a front-line soldier exempted him; however, his public membership in the social-democratic left was reason enough (for the Nazis) for dismissal.

In 1936, after one year at Cambridge, Courant accepted a professorship at New York University in New York City. There he founded an institute for graduate studies in applied mathematics. The Courant Institute of Mathematical Sciences (as it was renamed in 1964) is now one of the most respected research centers in applied mathematics.

Courant and David Hilbert authored the influential textbook Methoden der mathematischen Physik, which, with its revised editions, is still current and widely used since its publication in 1924. With Herbert Robbins, Courant coauthored a popular overview of higher mathematics, intended for the general public, titled What is Mathematics?. With Fritz John, he coauthored the two-volume work Introduction to Calculus and Analysis, first published in 1965.

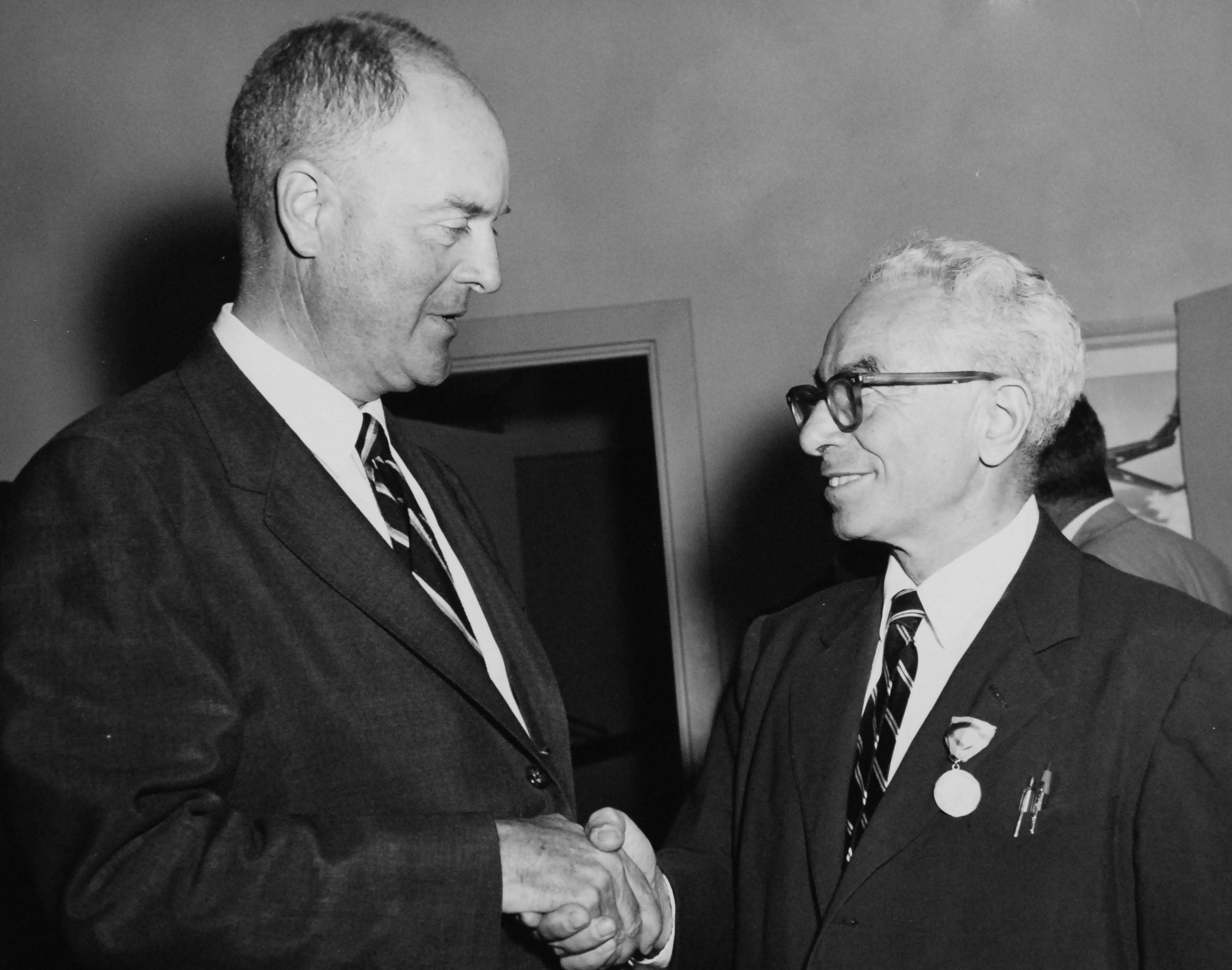
Garrison Norton, Assistant Secretary of the Navy for Air, congratulates Courant (right) after presenting him with the Distinguished Public Service Award during Pentagon ceremonies on July 18, 1958

Courant's name is also attached to the finite element method, with his numerical treatment of the plain torsion problem for multiply-connected domains, published in 1943. This method is now one of the standard ways to solve partial differential equations numerically. Courant is a namesake of the Courant–Friedrichs–Lewy condition and the Courant minimax principle.

Courant was an elected member of both the American Philosophical Society (1953) and the United States National Academy of Sciences (1955). In 1965, the Mathematical Association of America recognized his contributions with its Award for Distinguished Service to Mathematics.

Courant died of a stroke in New Rochelle, New York on January 27, 1972, aged 84.

== Perspective on mathematics ==
Commenting upon his analysis of experimental results from in-laboratory soap film formations, Courant explained why the existence of a physical solution does not obviate mathematical proof. Here is a quote from Courant on his mathematical perspective:

Empirical evidence can never establish mathematical existence–nor can the mathematician's demand for existence be dismissed by the physicist as useless rigor. Only a mathematical existence proof can ensure that the mathematical description of a physical phenomenon is meaningful.

== Personal life ==
In 1912, Courant married Nelly Neumann, who had earned her doctorate at Breslau in synthetic geometry in 1909. They lived together in Göttingen until they divorced in 1916. She was later murdered by the Nazis in 1942 for being Jewish.

In 1919, Courant married Nerina (Nina) Runge (1891–1991), daughter of Göttingen professor for Applied Mathematics, Carl Runge (of Runge–Kutta fame) and sister of Iris Runge, applied mathematician and physicist.

Richard and Nerina had four children: Ernest (1920–2020), a particle physicist and innovator in particle accelerators; Gertrude (1922–2014), a biologist who married mathematician Jürgen Moser (1928–1999); Hans (1924-2019), a physicist who participated in the Manhattan Project; and Leonore (known as "Lori", 1928–2015), a professional violist who married first mathematician Jerome Berkowitz (1928–1998) and secondly mathematician Peter Lax.

== Publications ==
- Courant, R. (1988) [1937], Differential and Integral Calculus, vol. I, translated by McShane, E. J. (2nd ed.), New York: Wiley Interscience, ISBN 978-0-471-60842-4
- Courant, R. (1988) [1936], Differential and Integral Calculus, vol. II, translated by McShane, E. J., New York: Wiley Interscience, ISBN 978-0-471-60840-0
- Courant, Richard; John, Fritz (1965), Introduction to Calculus and Analysis, vol. I, New York: Interscience, ISBN 978-3-540-65058-4
- Courant, Richard; John, Fritz (1974), Introduction to Calculus and Analysis, vol. II/1, New York: Interscience, ISBN 978-3-540-66569-4
- Courant, Richard; John, Fritz (1974), Introduction to Calculus and Analysis, vol. II/2, New York: Interscience, ISBN 978-3-540-66570-0
- Courant, Richard; Hilbert, David (2024) [1924], Methods of Mathematical Physics, vol. I, New York: Interscience, ISBN 978-3-527-41447-5, MR 0065391 (archive) (translated from German: Methoden der mathematischen Physik I, 2nd ed, 1931)
- Courant, Richard; Hilbert, David (2024) [1924], Methods of Mathematical Physics, vol. II, New York: Interscience, doi:10.1002/9783527617234, ISBN 978-3-527-41448-2, MR 0140802 (translated from German: Methoden der mathematischen Physik II, 1937)
- Courant, R.; Friedrichs, K. O. (1948), Supersonic Flow and Shock Waves, New York: Interscience, Bibcode:1948sfsw.book.....C
- Courant, Richard; Robbins, Herbert (1941), What is Mathematics?, Oxford University Press

== Sources ==
- Reid, Constance (1976). Courant in Göttingen and New York. The Story of an Improbable Mathematician. New York, Heidelberg, Berlin: Springer-Verlag. ISBN 978-0-387-90194-7.
- Medawar, Jean; Pyke, David (2012). Hitler's Gift: The True Story of the Scientists Expelled by the Nazi Regime. New York: Arcade Publishing. ISBN 978-1-61145-709-4.
