= Numerical range =

Aspect of a numerical matrix

In the mathematical field of linear algebra and convex analysis, the numerical range or field of values or Wertvorrat or Wertevorrat of a complex $n \times n$ matrix A is the set
$$W(A)
= \left.\left\{\frac{\mathbf{x}^*A\mathbf{x}}{\mathbf{x}^*\mathbf{x}} \;\right|\; \mathbf{x} \in \mathbb{C}^n,\ \mathbf{x} \neq 0\right\}
= \big\{\langle\mathbf{x}, A\mathbf{x} \rangle \;\big|\; \mathbf{x} \in \mathbb{C}^n,\ \|\mathbf{x}\|_2 = 1\big\}$$
where $\mathbf{x}^*$ denotes the conjugate transpose of the vector $\mathbf{x}$. The numerical range includes, in particular, the diagonal entries of the matrix (obtained by choosing x equal to the unit vectors along the coordinate axes) and the eigenvalues of the matrix (obtained by choosing x equal to the eigenvectors).

Equivalently, the elements of $W(A)$ are of the form $\operatorname{tr}(AP)$, where $P$ is a Hermitian projection operator from $\C^n$ to a one-dimensional subspace.

In engineering, numerical ranges are used as a rough estimate of eigenvalues of A. Recently, generalizations of the numerical range are used to study quantum computing.

A related concept is the numerical radius, which is the largest absolute value of the numbers in the numerical range, i.e.
$$r(A) = \sup \big\{ |\lambda| : \lambda \in W(A) \big\} = \sup_{\|x\|_2=1} \big|\langle\mathbf{x}, A\mathbf{x} \rangle\big|.$$

== Properties ==
Let sum of sets denote a sumset.

General properties

1. The numerical range is the range of the Rayleigh quotient.
2. (Hausdorff–Toeplitz theorem) The numerical range is convex and compact.
3. $W(\alpha A+\beta I)=\alpha W(A)+\{\beta\}$ for all square matrix $A$ and complex numbers $\alpha$ and $\beta$. Here $I$ is the identity matrix.
4. $W(A)$ is a subset of the closed right half-plane if and only if $A+A^*$ is positive semidefinite.
5. The numerical range $W(\cdot)$ is the only function on the set of square matrices that satisfies (2), (3) and (4).
6. $W(UAU^*) = W(A)$ for any unitary $U$.
7. $W(A^*) = W(A)^*$.
8. If $A$ is Hermitian, then $W(A)$ is on the real line. If $A$ is anti-Hermitian, then $W(A)$ is on the imaginary line.
9. $W(A) = \{z\}$ if and only if $A = zI$.
10. (Sub-additive) $W(A+B)\subseteq W(A)+W(B)$.
11. $W(A)$ contains all the eigenvalues of $A$.
12. The numerical range of a $2 \times 2$ matrix is a filled ellipse.
13. $W(A)$ is a real line segment $[\alpha, \beta]$ if and only if $A$ is a Hermitian matrix with its smallest and the largest eigenvalues being $\alpha$ and $\beta$.

Normal matrices

1. If $A$ is normal, and $x \in \operatorname{span}(v_1, \dots, v_k)$, where $v_1, \ldots, v_k$ are eigenvectors of $A$ corresponding to $\lambda_1, \ldots, \lambda_k$, respectively, then $\langle x,Ax\rangle \in \operatorname{hull}\left(\lambda_1, \ldots, \lambda_k\right)$.
2. If $A$ is a normal matrix, then $W(A)$ is the convex hull of its eigenvalues.
3. If $\alpha$ is a sharp point on the boundary of $W(A)$, then $\alpha$ is a normal eigenvalue of $A$.

Numerical radius

1. $r(\cdot)$ is a unitarily invariant norm on the space of $n \times n$ matrices.
2. $r(A) \leq \|A\|_{\operatorname{op}} \leq 2r(A)$, where $\|\cdot\|_{\operatorname{op}}$ denotes the operator norm.
3. $r(A) = \|A\|_{\operatorname{op}}$ if (but not only if) $A$ is normal.
4. $r(A^n) \le r(A)^n$.

== Proofs ==
Most of the claims are obvious. Some are not.

=== General properties ===
Proof of (13)

If $A$ is Hermitian, then it is normal, so it is the convex hull of its eigenvalues, which are all real.

Conversely, assume $W(A)$ is on the real line. Decompose $A = B + C$, where $B$ is a Hermitian matrix, and $C$ an anti-Hermitian matrix. Since $W(C)$ is on the imaginary line, if $C \neq 0$, then $W(A)$ would stray from the real line. Thus $C = 0$, and $A$ is Hermitian.

The following proof is due to

Proof of (12)

The elements of $W(A)$ are of the form $\operatorname{tr}(AP)$, where $P$ is projection from $\C^2$ to a one-dimensional subspace.

The space of all one-dimensional subspaces of $\C^2$ is $\mathbb P\mathbb C^1$, which is a 2-sphere. The image of a 2-sphere under a linear projection is a filled ellipse.

In more detail, such $P$ are of the form
$$\frac 12 I + \frac 12 \begin{bmatrix}\cos2\theta & e^{i\phi} \sin 2\theta \\ e^{-i\phi} \sin 2\theta & -\cos2\theta  \end{bmatrix} = \frac 12 \begin{bmatrix}1 + z & x + iy \\ x - iy & 1-z  \end{bmatrix}$$
where $x, y, z$, satisfying $x^2+y^2+z^2 =1$, is a point on the unit 2-sphere.

Therefore, the elements of $W(A)$, regarded as elements of $\R^2$ is the composition of two real linear maps
$$(x,y,z) \mapsto \frac 12 \begin{bmatrix}1 + z & x + iy \\ x - iy & 1-z \end{bmatrix}$$
and $M \mapsto \operatorname{tr}(AM)$, which maps the 2-sphere to a filled ellipse.

Proof of (2)

$W(A)$ is the image of a continuous map $x \mapsto \langle x,Ax\rangle$ from the $\mathbb{PC}^n$, so it is compact.

Given two complex nonzero vectors $x, y$, let $P_x, P_y$ be their corresponding Hermitian projectors from $\mathbb{C}^n$ to their respective spans. Let $P$ be the Hermitian projector to the span of both. We have that $P^*AP$ is an operator on $\operatorname{Span}(x, y)$.

Therefore, the “restricted numerical range” of $P^*AP$, defined by $\{\operatorname{Tr}(P^*APP_z) : z \in \operatorname{Span}(x, y), z \neq 0\}$, is a closed ellipse, according to (12). It is also the case that if $z \in \operatorname{Span}(x,y)$ is nonzero, then $\operatorname{Tr}(P^*APP_z) = \operatorname{Tr}(APP_zP) = \operatorname{Tr}(AP_z) \in W(A)$. Therefore, the restricted numerical range is contained in the full numerical range of $A$.

Thus, if $W(A)$ contains $\operatorname{Tr}(AP_x), \operatorname{Tr}(AP_y)$, then it contains a closed ellipse that also contains $\operatorname{Tr}(AP_x), \operatorname{Tr}(AP_y)$, so it contains the line segment between them.

Proof of (5)

Let $W$ satisfy these properties. Let $W_0$ be the original numerical range.

Fix some matrix $A$. We show that the supporting planes of $W(A)$ and $W_0(A)$ are identical. This would then imply that $W(A) = W_0(A)$ since they are both convex and compact.

By property (4), $W(A)$ is nonempty. Let $z$ be a point on the boundary of $W(A)$, then we can translate and rotate the complex plane so that the point translates to the origin, and the region $W(A)$ falls entirely within $\C^+$. That is, for some $\phi\in \R$, the set $e^{i\phi}(W(A)-z)$ lies entirely within $\C^+$, while for any $t > 0$, the set $e^{i\phi}(W(A)-z) - tI$ does not lie entirely in $\C^+$.

The two properties of $W$ then imply that
$$e^{i\phi}(A-z) + e^{-i\phi}(A-z)^* \succeq 0$$
and that inequality is sharp, meaning that $e^{i\phi}(A-z) + e^{-i\phi}(A-z)^*$ has a zero eigenvalue. This is a complete characterization of the supporting planes of $W(A)$.

The same argument applies to $W_0(A)$, so they have the same supporting planes.

=== Normal matrices ===
Proof of (1), (2)

For (2), if $A$ is normal, then it has a full eigenbasis, so it reduces to (1).

Since $A$ is normal, by the spectral theorem, there exists a unitary matrix $U$ such that $A=U D U^*$, where $D$ is a diagonal matrix containing the eigenvalues $\lambda_1, \lambda_2, \ldots, \lambda_n$ of $A$.

Let $x=c_1 v_1+c_2 v_2+\cdots+c_k v_k$. Using the linearity of the inner product, that $A v_j=\lambda_j v_j$, and that $\left\{v_i\right\}$ are orthonormal, we have:

$$\langle x, A x\rangle=\sum_{i, j=1}^k c_i^* c_j\left\langle v_i, \lambda_j v_j\right\rangle = \sum_{i=1}^k\left|c_i\right|^2 \lambda_i \in \operatorname{hull}\left(\lambda_1, \ldots, \lambda_k\right)$$

Proof (3)

By affineness of $W$, we can translate and rotate the complex plane, so that we reduce to the case where $\partial W(A)$ has a sharp point at $0$, and that the two supporting planes at that point both make an angle $\phi_1, \phi_2$ with the imaginary axis, such that $\phi_1 < \phi_2, e^{i\phi_1} \neq e^{i\phi_2}$ since the point is sharp.

Since $0 \in W(A)$, there exists a unit vector $x_0$ such that $x_0^* Ax_0 = 0$.

By general property (4), the numerical range lies in the sectors defined by:
$$\operatorname{Re}\left(e^{i\theta} \langle x, Ax \rangle\right) \geq 0 \quad \text{for all } \theta \in [\phi_1, \phi_2] \text{ and nonzero } x \in \mathbb{C}^n.$$
At $x = x_0$, the directional derivative in any direction $y$ must vanish to maintain non-negativity. Specifically:
$$\left. \frac{d}{dt} \operatorname{Re}\left(e^{i\theta} \langle x_0 + ty, A(x_0 + ty) \rangle\right) \right|_{t=0} = 0 \quad \forall y \in \mathbb C^n, \theta \in [\phi_1, \phi_2].$$
Expanding this derivative:
$$\operatorname{Re}\left(e^{i\theta} \left(\langle y, Ax_0 \rangle + \langle x_0, Ay \rangle\right)\right) = 0 \quad \forall y \in \mathbb{C}^n, \theta \in [\phi_1, \phi_2].$$

Since the above holds for all $\theta \in [\phi_1, \phi_2]$, we must have:
$$\langle y, Ax_0 \rangle + \langle x_0, Ay \rangle = 0 \quad \forall y \in \mathbb{C}^n.$$

For any $y \in \mathbb{C}^n$ and $\alpha \in \mathbb{C}$, substitute $\alpha y$ into the equation:
$$\alpha \langle y, Ax_0 \rangle + \alpha^* \langle x_0, Ay \rangle = 0.$$
Choose $\alpha = 1$ and $\alpha = i$, then simplify, we obtain $\langle y, Ax_0 \rangle = 0$ for all $y$, thus $Ax_0 = 0$.

=== Numerical radius ===
Proof of (2)

Let $v = \arg\max_{\|x\|_2= 1} |\langle x,Ax\rangle|$. We have $r(A) = |\langle v,Av\rangle|$.

By Cauchy–Schwarz,
$$|\langle v,Av\rangle| \leq \|v\|_2 \|Av\|_2 = \|Av\|_2  \leq \|A\|_{op}$$

For the other one, let $A = B + iC$, where $B, C$ are Hermitian.
$$\|A\|_{op} \leq \|B \|_{op} + \|C \|_{op}$$

Since $W(B)$ is on the real line, and $W(iC)$ is on the imaginary line, the extremal points of $W(B), W(iC)$ appear in $W(A)$, shifted, thus both $\|B\|_{op} = r(B) \leq r(A), \|C\|_{op} = r(iC) \leq r(A)$.

== Generalisations ==
- C-numerical range
- Joint numerical range
- Product numerical range
- Polynomial numerical hull

=== Higher-rank numerical range ===
The numerical range is equivalent to the following definition:
$$W(A) = \{\lambda \in \C : PMP = \lambda P \text{ for some Hermitian projector } P \text{ of rank }1\}.$$
This allows a generalization to higher-rank numerical ranges, one for each $k = 1, 2, 3, \dots$:
$$W_k(A) = \{\lambda \in \C : PMP = \lambda P \text{ for some Hermitian projector } P \text{ of rank }k\}.$$
$W_k(A)$ is always closed and convex, but it might be empty. It is guaranteed to be nonempty if $k < n/3 + 1$, and there exists some $A$ such that $W_k(A)$ is empty if $k \geq n/3 + 1$.

== See also ==
- Spectral theory
- Rayleigh quotient
- Workshop on Numerical Ranges and Numerical Radii

== Bibliography ==
Books

- Bonsall, F.F.; Duncan, J. (1971), Numerical Ranges of Operators on Normed Spaces and of Elements of Normed Algebras, Cambridge University Press, ISBN 978-0-521-07988-4
- Bonsall, F.F.; Duncan, J. (1973), Numerical Ranges II, Cambridge University Press, ISBN 978-0-521-20227-5
- Horn, Roger A.; Johnson, Charles R. (1991), Topics in Matrix Analysis, Cambridge University Press, Chapter 1, ISBN 978-0-521-46713-1.
- Horn, Roger A.; Johnson, Charles R. (1990), Matrix Analysis, Cambridge University Press, Ch. 5.7, ex. 21, ISBN 0-521-30586-1
- Bhatia, Rajendra (1997). Matrix analysis. Graduate texts in mathematics. New York Berlin Heidelberg: Springer. ISBN 978-0-387-94846-1.
- Gustafson, Karl E.; Rao, Duggirala K. M. (1997). Numerical Range: The Field of Values of Linear Operators and Matrices. Universitext. New York, NY: Springer. doi:10.1007/978-1-4613-8498-4. ISBN 978-0-387-94835-5. ISSN 0172-5939.

Papers

- Toeplitz, Otto (1918). "Das algebraische Analogon zu einem Satze von Fejér" (PDF). Mathematische Zeitschrift (in German). 2 (1–2): 187–197. doi:10.1007/BF01212904. ISSN 0025-5874.
- Hausdorff, Felix (1919). "Der Wertvorrat einer Bilinearform". Mathematische Zeitschrift (in German). 3 (1): 314–316. doi:10.1007/BF01292610. ISSN 0025-5874.
- Choi, M.D.; Kribs, D.W.; Życzkowski (2006), "Quantum error correcting codes from the compression formalism", Rep. Math. Phys., 58 (1): 77–91, arXiv:quant-ph/0511101, Bibcode:2006RpMP...58...77C, doi:10.1016/S0034-4877(06)80041-8, S2CID 119427312.
- Dirr, G.; Helmkel, U.; Kleinsteuber, M.; Schulte-Herbrüggen, Th. (2006), "A new type of C-numerical range arising in quantum computing", Proc. Appl. Math. Mech., 6: 711–712, doi:10.1002/pamm.200610336
- Li, C.K. (1996), "A simple proof of the elliptical range theorem", Proc. Am. Math. Soc., 124 (7): 1985, doi:10.1090/S0002-9939-96-03307-2.
- Keeler, Dennis S.; Rodman, Leiba; Spitkovsky, Ilya M. (1997), "The numerical range of 3 × 3 matrices", Linear Algebra and Its Applications, 252 (1–3): 115, doi:10.1016/0024-3795(95)00674-5.
- Johnson, Charles R. (1976). "Functional characterizations of the field of values and the convex hull of the spectrum" (PDF). Proceedings of the American Mathematical Society. 61 (2). American Mathematical Society (AMS): 201–204. doi:10.1090/s0002-9939-1976-0437555-3. ISSN 0002-9939.
