= Pulsed DC =

Periodic, time-varying but non-reversing current such as is produced by a rectifier

Types of electric current

Rectification of a sine wave produces pulsed DC.

Pulsed DC (PDC) or pulsating direct current is a periodic current which changes in value but never changes direction. Some authors use the term pulsed DC to describe a signal consisting of one or more rectangular ("flat-topped"), rather than sinusoidal, pulses.

Pulsed DC is commonly produced from AC (alternating current) by a half-wave rectifier or a full-wave rectifier. Full wave rectified ac is more commonly known as Rectified AC. PDC has some characteristics of both alternating current (AC) and direct current (DC) waveforms. The voltage of a DC wave is roughly constant, whereas the voltage of an AC waveform continually varies between positive and negative values. Like an AC wave, the voltage of a PDC wave continually varies, but like a DC wave, the sign of the voltage is constant.

Pulsating direct current is used on PWM controllers.

== Smoothing ==
Most modern electronic items function using a DC voltage, so the PDC waveform must usually be smoothed before use. A reservoir capacitor converts the PDC wave into a DC waveform with some superimposed ripple. When the PDC voltage is initially applied, it charges the capacitor, which acts as a short term storage device to keep the output at an acceptable level while the PDC waveform is at a low voltage. Voltage regulation is often also applied using either linear or switching regulation.

== Difference from AC ==
Pulsating direct current has an average value equal to a constant (DC) along with a time-dependent pulsating component added to it, while the average value of alternating current is zero in steady state (or a constant if it has a DC offset, value of which will then be equal to that offset). Devices and circuits may respond differently to pulsating DC than they would to non-pulsating DC, such as a battery or regulated power supply and should be evaluated.

== Uses ==
Pulsed DC may also be generated for purposes other than rectification. It is often used to reduce electric arcs when generating thin carbon films, and for increasing yield in semiconductor fabrication by reducing electrostatic build-up. It is also generated by the voltage regulators in some automobiles, e.g., the classic air-cooled Volkswagen Beetle.

Pulsed DC is also commonly used in driving light-emitting diodes (LEDs) to lower the intensity. Since light-emitting diodes cannot be reliably dimmed through the simple reduction of voltage as in an incandescent bulb, pulsed DC is used to produce many rapid flashes of light that to the human eye are indiscernible as individual flashes, but are seen as a lower brightness. Since an LED has no traditional filament to stress, this also has the added effect of prolonging the lifespan of the LED by reducing its on-time. This can sometimes be seen on videos where an LED or lamp assembly composed of LEDs is filmed at a frame rate very close to - but not exactly - the same as the pulsed DC frequency, which causes the lamp to slowly and occasionally fade in and out as the LEDs fall out of synchronization with the video frame.

== Dangers ==
While smoothed DC is less dangerous than the same current level of AC, pulsed DC can be more dangerous than AC. Short DC pulses below 100 μs are more efficient at evoking action potentials and disturbing the conduction systems in the body than AC which usually has a much smoother and longer wave form. Therefore lower levels of current will be enough to cause the same effects equal to those of AC. On the other hand at shorter waveform AC will also have a higher frequency which is less effective at stimulating nerves and muscles due to its biphasic nature which doesn't allow a build up of enough charge, in the short time between phases, to depolarize cell membranes in order to evoke an action potential.

== See also ==
- Voltage ripple
- Rectifier

== Bibliography ==
- This article incorporates public domain material from Federal Standard 1037C. General Services Administration. Archived from the original on 2022-01-22.
