= Transmission zeroes =

Generally, in a two-port network, for a finite input, there exists an output. However, when zero output occurs for finite input, the network is said to have 'zero-transmission'. A transmission zero is a frequency at which the transfer function of a linear two-port network has zero transmission. Transmission zeroes at zero frequency and infinite frequency may be found in high-pass filters and low-pass filters respectively. Transmission zeroes at finite, non-zero frequency may be found in band-stop filters, elliptic filters, and type II Chebyshev filters. Transfer functions with both zero and infinite frequency can be found in band-pass filters. A transfer function may have multiple zeroes at the same frequency. A transfer function may have any number of transmission zeroes at zero frequency and infinite frequency, but transmission zeroes at finite non-zero frequency always come in conjugate pairs.

Combination of elements may prevent input from reaching the output by 'shortening' or 'opening' all transmission path by means of serial or parallel reasonance. For a more general overview, see: of zeros and poles.

== Circuits with transmission zeroes ==
=== Generalized impedance converter ===
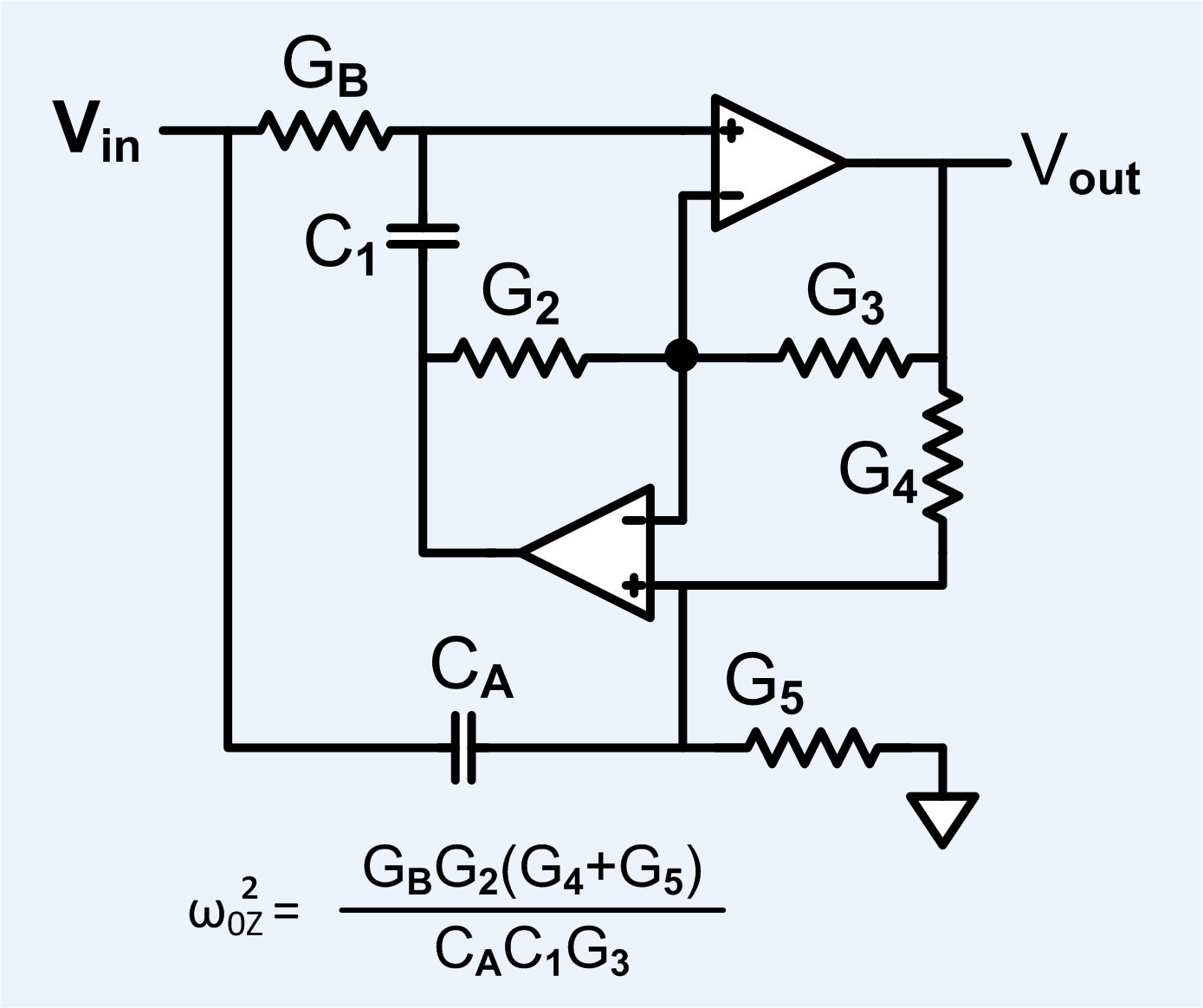
A GIC (generalized impedance converter) based circuit that has finite non-zero transmission zeroes.

The circuit depicted to the left, based on a GIC (generalized impedance converter), has finite non-zero transmission zeroes.

=== State variable derived ===
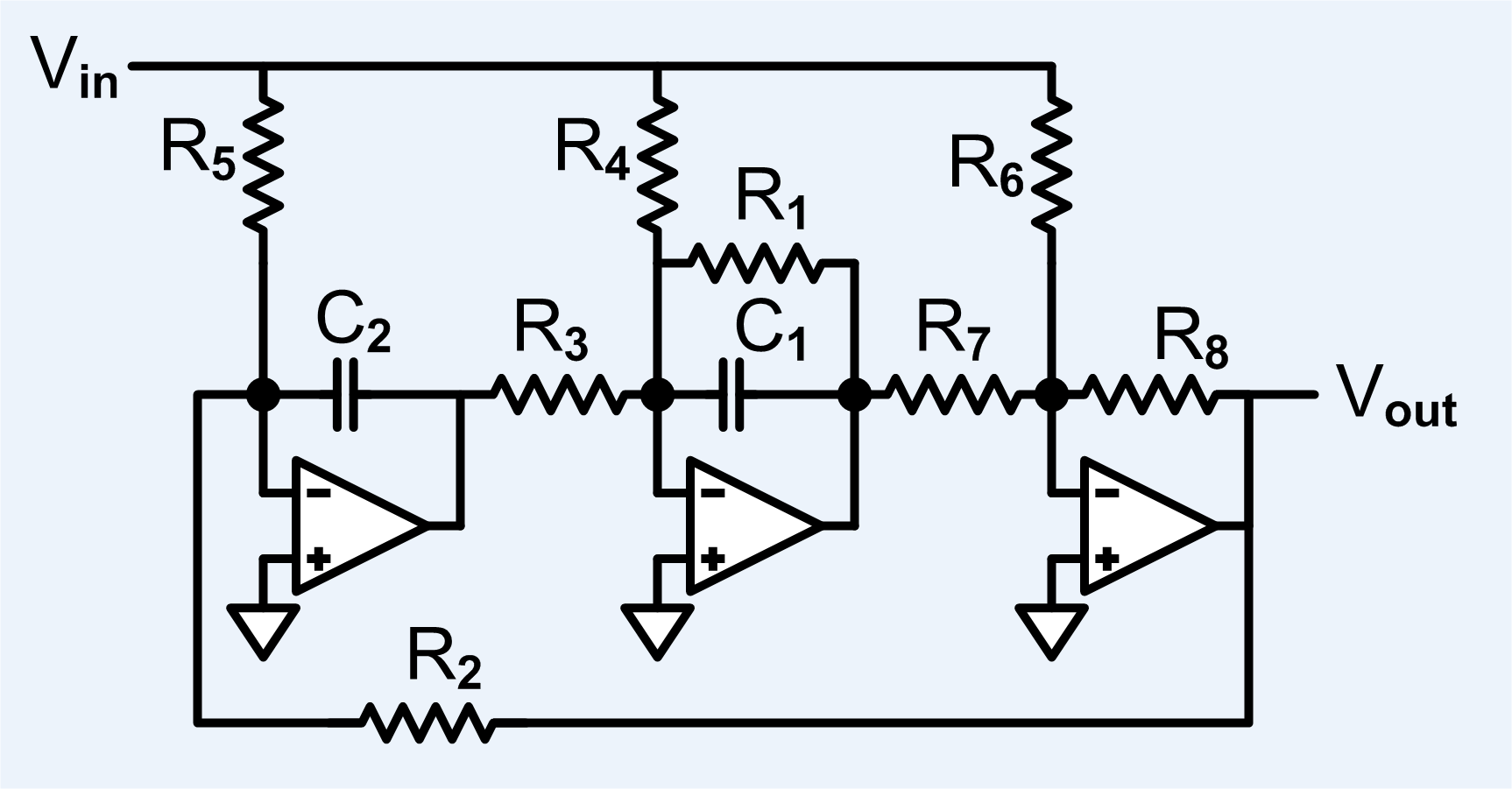
A state variable filter derivation that has transmission zeroes under the condition that R1/R4 = R7/R6.

The filter circuit to the right has the following transfer function:

$$H(s) = - \left ( \frac {R_2 R_8} {R_5 R_6} \right ) \frac {s^2 R_3 C_1 R_5 C_2 + s[ (\frac {R_3} {R_1}) (1 - \frac {R_1 R_6} {R_4 R_7}) R_5 C_2 ] +  \frac {R_6} {R_7}}
{s^2 R_3 C_1 R_2 C_2+ s( \frac {R_3} {R_1} ) R_2 C_2 +\frac {R_8} {R_7}}$$

This circuit produces transmission zeroes at

$$\omega_{0Z} = \left [  \frac { R_6 / R_7 } {R_3 C_1 R_5 C_2}  \right ]^\frac {1} {2}$$

when R_{1}/R_{4} = R_{7}/R_{6}.

=== Passive two-port ===
A few procedures can be followed for realizing passive two-ports with transmission zeroes.

- As long as transmission zeros are located at the origin or infinity, all that is needed is the application of Cauer 1 or 2 steps to remove poles from either the admittance or the impedance at the origin or infinity. These removals can always be effected by long division.
- The order in which the poles are removed is arbitrary. Except for very simple networks or when all transmission zeros occur at the origin or infinity, generally there are several possible circuits that will realize a given $Z_{21}(s)$, depending on the order in which the poles are removed. The proportionality constants are generally different for different realizations.
