= Chebyshev iteration =

In numerical linear algebra, the Chebyshev iteration is an iterative method for determining the solutions of a system of linear equations. The method is named after Russian mathematician Pafnuty Chebyshev.

Chebyshev iteration avoids the computation of inner products as is necessary for the other nonstationary methods. For some distributed-memory architectures these inner products are a bottleneck with respect to efficiency. The price one pays for avoiding inner products is that the method requires enough knowledge about spectrum of the coefficient matrix A, that is an upper estimate for the upper eigenvalue and lower estimate for the lower eigenvalue. There are modifications of the method for nonsymmetric matrices A.

== Example code in MATLAB ==
function [x] = SolChebyshev002(A, b, x0, iterNum, lMax, lMin)

  d = (lMax + lMin) / 2;
  c = (lMax - lMin) / 2;
  preCond = eye(size(A)); % Preconditioner
  x = x0;
  r = b - A * x;

  for i = 1:iterNum % size(A, 1)
      z = linsolve(preCond, r);
      if (i == 1)
          p = z;
          alpha = 1/d;
      else if (i == 2)
          beta = (1/2) * (c * alpha)^2
          alpha = 1/(d - beta / alpha);
          p = z + beta * p;
      else
          beta = (c * alpha / 2)^2;
          alpha = 1/(d - beta / alpha);
          p = z + beta * p;
      end;

      x = x + alpha * p;
      r = b - A * x; %(= r - alpha * A * p)
      if (norm(r) < 1e-15), break; end; % stop if necessary
  end;
end

Code translated from and.

== See also ==
- Iterative method. Linear systems
- List of numerical analysis topics. Solving systems of linear equations
- Jacobi iteration
- Gauss–Seidel method
- Modified Richardson iteration
- Successive over-relaxation
- Conjugate gradient method
- Generalized minimal residual method
- Biconjugate gradient method
- IML++
