= David M. Young Jr. =

American mathematician

- Born: October 20, 1923; Quincy, Massachusetts, US
- Died: December 21, 2008 (aged 85); Austin, Texas, US
- Education: Webb Institute of Naval Architecture; Harvard University
- Known for: successive over-relaxation and symmetric successive over-relaxation methods
- Scientific career
- Workplaces: University of Maryland, College Park; University of Texas at Austin
- Doctoral advisor: Garrett Birkhoff

David M. Young Jr. (October 20, 1923 – December 21, 2008) was an American mathematician and computer scientist who was one of the pioneers in the field of modern numerical analysis/scientific computing.

== Contributions ==
Young is best known for establishing the mathematical framework for iterative methods (a.k.a. preconditioning). These algorithms are now used in computer software on high performance supercomputers for the numerical solution of large sparse linear systems arising from problems involving partial differential equations. See, in particular, the successive over-relaxation (SOR) and symmetric successive over-relaxation (SSOR) methods.

When Young first began his research on iterative methods in the late 1940s, there was some skepticism with the idea of using iterative methods on the new computing machines to solve industrial-size problems. Ever since Young's ground-breaking Ph.D. thesis, iterative methods have been used on a wide range of scientific and engineering applications with a variety of new iterative methods having been developed.

== Education and career ==
Young earned a bachelor's degree in 1944 from the Webb Institute of Naval Architecture. After service in the U.S. Navy during part of World War II, he went to Harvard University to study mathematics and was awarded a master's degree in 1947 and a Ph.D in 1950, working under the supervision of Professor Garrett Birkhoff. Young began his academic career at the University of Maryland, College Park and he was the first to teach a mathematics course focusing mainly on numerical analysis and computer programming. After several years working in the aero-space industry in Los Angeles, he joined the faculty of the University of Texas at Austin, Texas, in 1958. Young was the founding Director of the university Computation Center and then the research Center for Numerical Analysis (CNA) in 1970. He would become the Ashbel Smith Professor of Mathematics and Computer Sciences as well as a founding member of the Institute for Computational Engineering and Sciences (ICES), all at the University of Texas at Austin.

== Awards and honors ==
Young was awarded the title: Fellow of the American Association for the Advancement of Science. He was honored by the Association for Computing Machinery (ACM) in 1990 for "outstanding contributions to computer science". In October 1988, the first IMACS International Conference on Iterative Method was held in Austin, Texas, in honor of Young's 65th birthday. The book Iterative Methods for Large Linear Systems (David R. Kincaid and Linda J. Hayes, eds., Academic Press, 1990) contains the invited presentations. A special issue of the Journal of Linear Algebra and Its Applications was dedicated to Young for his 70th birthday. In 1998, the fourth IMACS Iterative Conference was held at the University of Texas at Austin in special recognition of Young's 75th birthday and Richard Varga's 70th birthday. In 2000, a symposium was given at the SIAM Annual Meeting in Puerto Rico on the occasion of the 50th anniversary of Young's publication of the SOR method.

== Selected publications ==
=== Articles ===
- Birkhoff, G.; Young, D. M.; Zarantonello, E. H. (1951). "Effective Conformal Transformation of Smooth, Simply Connected Domains". Proceedings of the National Academy of Sciences. 37 (7): 411–414. Bibcode:1951PNAS...37..411B. doi:10.1073/pnas.37.7.411. ISSN 0027-8424. PMC 1063389. PMID 16578373.
- Young, David (1954). "Iterative methods for solving partial difference equations of elliptic type". Transactions of the American Mathematical Society. 76: 92. doi:10.1090/S0002-9947-1954-0059635-7.
- —— (1970). "Convergence properties of the symmetric and unsymmetric successive overrelaxation methods and related methods". Mathematics of Computation. 24 (112): 793. doi:10.1090/S0025-5718-1970-0281331-4.
- Kincaid, David R.; —— (1972). "The modified successive overrelaxation method with fixed parameters". Mathematics of Computation. 26 (119): 705. doi:10.1090/S0025-5718-1972-0331746-2.
- —— (1972). "On the Consistency of Linear Stationary Iterative Methods". SIAM Journal on Numerical Analysis. 9 (1): 89–96. Bibcode:1972SJNA....9...89Y. doi:10.1137/0709010.
- —— (April 1973). "A Survey of Modern Numerical Analysis". SIAM Review. 15 (2, Part 2: Anniversary Supplement): 503–523. doi:10.1137/1015069. JSTOR 2028682.
- Hageman, L. A.; Luk, Franklin T.; —— (1980). "On the Equivalence of Certain Iterative Acceleration Methods". SIAM Journal on Numerical Analysis. 17 (6): 852–873. Bibcode:1980SJNA...17..852H. doi:10.1137/0717071.
- ——; Mai, Tsun-Zee (1988). "Iterative algorithms and software for solving large sparse linear systems". Communications in Applied Numerical Methods. 4 (3): 435–456. doi:10.1002/cnm.1630040318.
- Adams, Loyce M.; Leveque, Randall J.; —— (1988). "Analysis of the SOR Iteration for the 9-Point Laplacian". SIAM Journal on Numerical Analysis. 25 (5): 1156–1180. Bibcode:1988SJNA...25.1156A. doi:10.1137/0725066.
- Chen, Jen-Yuan; Kincaid, David R.; —— (1999). "Generalizations and modifications of the GMRES iterative method". Numerical Algorithms. 21 (1): 119–146. Bibcode:1999NuAlg..21..119C. doi:10.1023/A:1019105328973. S2CID 20690771.

=== Books ===
- A Survey of Numerical Mathematics (with Robert Todd Gregory), Vol. 1-2, Addison-Wesley, 1973. (reprinted by Dover, 1988, vol. 1 & vol. 2)
- Iterative Solution of Large Linear Systems, Academic Press, 1971. (reprinted by Dover, 2003); 2014 pbk edition, Elsevier
- Applied Iterative Methods (with Louis A. Hageman), Academic Press, 1981. (reprinted by Dover, 2004); 2016 pbk edition, Elsevier
