= Birkhoff's theorem =

Birkhoff's theorem may refer to several theorems named for the American mathematician George David Birkhoff:

- Birkhoff's theorem (relativity)
- Birkhoff's theorem (electromagnetism)
- Birkhoff's ergodic theorem

It may also refer to theorems named for his son, Garrett Birkhoff:

- Birkhoff–von Neumann theorem for doubly stochastic matrices
- Birkhoff's HSP theorem, concerning the closure operations of homomorphism, subalgebra and product
- Birkhoff's representation theorem for distributive lattices
- Birkhoff's theorem (equational logic), stating that syntactic and semantic consequence coincide
