= MRF optimization via dual decomposition =

In dual decomposition a problem is broken into smaller subproblems and a solution to the relaxed problem is found. This method can be employed for MRF optimization. Dual decomposition is applied to markov logic programs as an inference technique.

== Background ==
Discrete MRF Optimization (inference) is very important in Machine Learning and Computer vision, which is realized on CUDA graphical processing units. Consider a graph $G = (V,E)$with nodes $V$and Edges $E$. The goal is to assign a label $l_p$to each $p \in V$so that the MRF Energy is minimized:

(1) $\min \Sigma_{p\in V} \theta_p(l_p) + \Sigma_{pq\in \varepsilon} \theta_{pq}(l_p)(l_q)$

Major MRF Optimization methods are based on Graph cuts or Message passing. They rely on the following integer linear programming formulation

(2) $\min_x E(\theta, x)= \theta.x = \sum_{p \in V} \theta_p.x_p+\sum_{pq \in \varepsilon} \theta_{pq}.x_{pq}$

In many applications, the MRF-variables are {0,1}-variables that satisfy: $x_p(l)=1$$\Leftrightarrow$label $l$ is assigned to $p$, while $x_{pq}(l,l^\prime) =1$ , labels $l,l^\prime$ are assigned to $p,q$.

== Dual Decomposition ==
The main idea behind decomposition is surprisingly simple:

1. decompose your original complex problem into smaller solvable subproblems,
2. extract a solution by cleverly combining the solutions from these subproblems.

A sample problem to decompose:

$\min_x \Sigma_{i} f^i(x)$where $x \in C$

In this problem, separately minimizing every single $f^i(x)$over $x$ is easy; but minimizing their sum is a complex problem. So the problem needs to get decomposed using auxiliary variables $\{x^i\}$and the problem will be as follows:

$\min_{\{x^i\},x} \Sigma_i f^i(x^i)$where $x^i \in C, x^i=x$

Now we can relax the constraints by multipliers $\{\lambda^i\}$ which gives us the following Lagrangian dual function:

$g(\{\lambda^i\}) =\min_{\{x^i \in C\},x} \Sigma_i f^i(x^i) + \Sigma_i \lambda^i.(x^i-x)=\min_{\{x^i \in C\},x} \Sigma_i [f^i(x^i)+\lambda^i.x^i]-(\Sigma_i \lambda^i)x$

Now we eliminate $x$ from the dual function by minimizing over $x$ and dual function becomes:

$g(\{\lambda^i\})=\min_{\{x^i \in C\}}\Sigma_i[f^i(x^i) + \lambda^i.x^i]$

We can set up a Lagrangian dual problem:

(3) $\max_{\{\lambda^i\}\in \Lambda} g({\lambda^i})=\Sigma_i g^i(x^i),$ The Master problem

(4) $g^i(x^i)=min_{x^i} f^i(x^i) +\lambda^i.x^i$where $x^i \in C$The Slave problems

== MRF optimization via Dual Decomposition ==
The original MRF optimization problem is NP-hard and we need to transform it into something easier.

$\tau$is a set of sub-trees of graph $G$where its trees cover all nodes and edges of the main graph. And MRFs defined for every tree $T$ in $\tau$will be smaller. The vector of MRF parameters is $\theta^T$and the vector of MRF variables is $x^T$, these two are just smaller in comparison with original MRF vectors $\theta, x$. For all vectors $\theta^T$we'll have the following:

(5) $\sum_{T \in \tau(p)} \theta_p^T= \theta_p, \sum_{T \in \tau(pq)} \theta_{pq}^T= \theta_{pq}.$

Where $\tau(p)$and $\tau(pq)$denote all trees of $\tau$than contain node $p$and edge $pq$respectively. We simply can write:

(6) $E(\theta,x)=\sum_{T \in \tau} E(\theta^T, x^T)$

And our constraints will be:

(7) $x^T \in \chi^T, x^T=x_{|T},\forall T \in \tau$

Our original MRF problem will become:

(8) $\min_{\{x^T\},x} \Sigma_{T \in \tau} E(\theta^T, x^T)$where $x^T \in \chi^T, \forall T \in \tau$and $x^T \in x_{|T}, \forall T \in \tau$

And we'll have the dual problem we were seeking:

(9) $\max_{\{\lambda^T\} \in \Lambda} g(\{\lambda^T\})= \sum_{T \in \tau} g^T(\lambda^T),$The Master problem

where each function $g^T(.)$is defined as:

(10) $g^T(\lambda^T)=\min_{x^T} E(\theta^T+ \lambda^T, x^T)$where $x^T \in \chi^T$The Slave problems

== Theoretical Properties ==
Theorem 1. Lagrangian relaxation (9) is equivalent to the LP relaxation of (2).

$\min_{\{x^T\},x} \{E(x, \theta)|x_p^T=s_p,x^T \in \text{CONVEXHULL}(\chi^T)\}$

Theorem 2. If the sequence of multipliers $\{\alpha_t\}$satisfies $\alpha_t \geq 0, \lim_{t \to \infin} \alpha_t = 0, \sum_{t=0}^\infin \alpha_t=\infin$then the algorithm converges to the optimal solution of (9).

Theorem 3. The distance of the current solution $\{\theta^T\}$to the optimal solution $\{\bar \theta^T\}$, which decreases at every iteration.

Theorem 4. Any solution obtained by the method satisfies the WTA (weak tree agreement) condition.

Theorem 5. For binary MRFs with sub-modular energies, the method computes a globally optimal solution.
