= Birkhoff =

Birkhoff is a surname. Notable people with the surname include:

- George David Birkhoff (1884–1944), American mathematician
- Garrett Birkhoff (1911–1996), American mathematician, son of George D.

== See also ==
- Birkhoff (crater)
- Birkhoff interpolation
- Birkhoff's axioms
- Birkhoff's theorem (disambiguation), multiple theorems
- Birkhoff decomposition, two different decompositions
- Birkhoff algorithm
- Poincaré–Birkhoff–Witt theorem
