= Relaxation (approximation) =

In mathematical optimization and related fields, relaxation is a modeling strategy. A relaxation is an approximation of a difficult problem by a nearby problem that is easier to solve. A solution of the relaxed problem provides information about the original problem.

For example, a linear programming relaxation of an integer programming problem removes the integrality constraint and so allows non-integer rational solutions. A Lagrangian relaxation of a complicated problem in combinatorial optimization penalizes violations of some constraints, allowing an easier relaxed problem to be solved. Relaxation techniques complement or supplement branch and bound algorithms of combinatorial optimization; linear programming and Lagrangian relaxations are used to obtain bounds in branch-and-bound algorithms for integer programming.

The modeling strategy of relaxation should not be confused with iterative methods of relaxation, such as successive over-relaxation (SOR); iterative methods of relaxation are used in solving problems in differential equations, linear least-squares, and linear programming. However, iterative methods of relaxation have been used to solve Lagrangian relaxations. (Note: Relaxation methods for finding feasible solutions to linear inequality systems arise in linear programming and in Lagrangian relaxation. '"`UNIQ--ref-00000003-QINU`"''"`UNIQ--ref-00000004-QINU`"''"`UNIQ--ref-00000005-QINU`"''"`UNIQ--ref-00000006-QINU`"''"`UNIQ--ref-00000007-QINU`"')

== Definition ==
A relaxation of the minimization problem

$$z = \min \{c(x) : x \in X \subseteq \mathbf{R}^{n}\}$$

is another minimization problem of the form

$$z_R = \min \{c_R(x) : x \in X_R \subseteq \mathbf{R}^{n}\}$$

with these two properties

1. $X_R \supseteq X$
2. $c_R(x) \leq c(x)$ for all $x \in X$.

The first property states that the original problem's feasible domain is a subset of the relaxed problem's feasible domain. The second property states that the original problem's objective-function is greater than or equal to the relaxed problem's objective-function.

=== Properties ===
If $x^*$ is an optimal solution of the original problem, then $x^* \in X \subseteq X_R$ and $z = c(x^*) \geq c_R(x^*)\geq z_R$. Therefore, $x^* \in X_R$ provides an upper bound on $z_R$.

If in addition to the previous assumptions, $c_R(x)=c(x)$, $\forall x\in X$, the following holds: If an optimal solution for the relaxed problem is feasible for the original problem, then it is optimal for the original problem.

== Some relaxation techniques ==
- Linear programming relaxation
- Lagrangian relaxation
- Semidefinite relaxation
- Surrogate relaxation and duality
