= NJA =

NJA may refer to:

- New Jewish Agenda, former US organization
- Naval Air Facility Atsugi, Japan, IATA code
- New Japan Aviation, Kagoshima, services company, ICAO code
- Newman-Janis Algorithm, a method of finding solutions in general relativity
