= Philip M. Whitman =

American mathematician

Philip Martin Whitman
- Education: Haverford College
- Alma mater: Harvard University
- Known for: Free lattice word problem
- Awards: AMS Honorary Member
- Scientific career
- Fields: Lattice theory
- Institutions: UPenn, Tufts
- Thesis: Free Lattices (1941)
- Doctoral advisor: Garrett Birkhoff

Philip Martin Whitman (December 23, 1916 – April 11, 1997) was an American mathematician who contributed to lattice theory, particularly the theory of free lattices.

Living in Pittsburgh, he attended Haverford College, where he earned a corporation scholarship for 1936–37, and a Clementine Cope fellowship for 1937–38, and was awarded highest honors in mathematical astronomy in 1937. He was elected to the college's chapter of Phi Beta Kappa society. In June 1937, he was conferred the Bachelor of Science degree from Haverford. According to Garrett Birkhoff, Whitman was an undergraduate Harvard student in 1937, and an outstanding graduate student not later than 1940, one of the first who taught elementary courses to freshmen in the mathematics department. In 1938 he earned his AM, and in June 1941 he obtained his Ph.D. degree from Harvard University. He was a member of the AMS not later than 1947, and was awarded an AMS honorary membership not later than 1995.

Whitman died on April 11, 1997 in Lexington, Massachusetts, at the age of 80.

== Selected publications ==
- Whitman, Philip Martin (Jun 1940). Schrödinger Wave Mechanics of the Hydrogen Atom (Manuscript minor thesis in mathematics). Harvard students' essays. Harvard University.
- Whitman, Philip Martin (1941). Free lattices (Ph.D. thesis). Harvard University.
- Philip Whitman (1941). "Free Lattices". Annals of Mathematics. 42 (1): 325–329. doi:10.2307/1969001. JSTOR 1969001.
- Philip Whitman (1942). "Free Lattices II". Annals of Mathematics. 43 (1): 104–115. doi:10.2307/1968883. JSTOR 1968883.
- Phillip M. Whitman (1943). "Splittings of a lattice". American Journal of Mathematics. 65 (1): 179–196. doi:10.2307/2371781. JSTOR 2371781.
- Philip Whitman (1946). "Lattices, equivalence relations, and subgroups". Bulletin of the American Mathematical Society. 52 (6): 507–522. doi:10.1090/s0002-9904-1946-08602-4.
- Philip M. Whitman (Apr 1948). "Groups with a cyclic group as lattice-homomorph". Annals of Mathematics. 49 (2): 347–351. doi:10.2307/1969283. JSTOR 1969283.
- Garrett Birkhoff; Philip M. Whitman (1949). "Representation of Jordan and Lie Algebras" (PDF). Transactions of the American Mathematical Society. 65 (1): 116–136. doi:10.2307/1990517. JSTOR 1990517.
- Philip M. Whitman (1961). "Status of word problems for lattices". In R. P. Dilworth (ed.). Lattice Theory. Proceedings of Symposia in Pure Mathematics. Vol. 2. Providence/RI: American Mathematical Society. pp. 17–21. ISBN 978-0-8218-1402-4.
