= Jørg Tofte Jebsen =

Norwegian physicist (1888–1922)

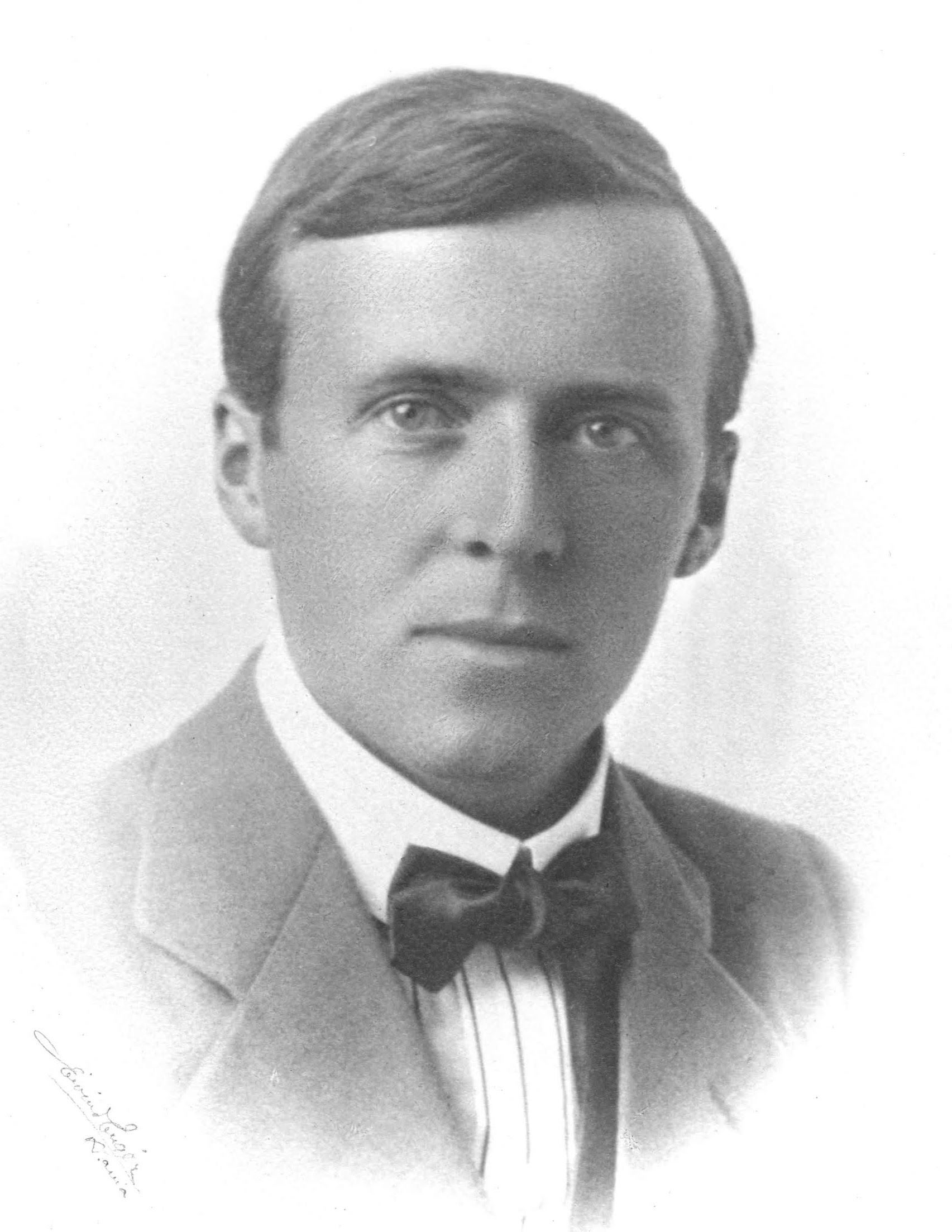
Jørg Tofte Jebsen, 1888 - 1922.

Jørg Tofte Jebsen (27 April 1888 – 7 January 1922) was a physicist from Norway, where he was the first to work on Einstein's general theory of relativity. In this connection he became known after his early death for what many now call the Jebsen-Birkhoff theorem for the metric tensor outside a general, spherical mass distribution.

== Biography ==
Jebsen was born and grew up in Berger, Vestfold, where his father Jens Johannes Jebsen ran two large textile mills. His mother was Agnes Marie Tofte and they had married in 1884. After elementary school he went through middle school and gymnasium in Oslo. He showed already then particular talents for mathematical topics.

After the final examen artium in 1906, he did not continue his academic studies at a university as would be normal at that time. He was meant to enter his father's company and spent for that purpose two years in Aachen in Germany where he studied textile manufacturing. After a shorter stay in England, he came back to Norway and started to work with his father.

But his interests for natural science took over so that in 1909 he started this field of study at University of Oslo. His work there was interrupted in the period 1911-12 when he was an assistant for Sem Sæland at the newly established Norwegian Institute of Technology (NTH) in Trondheim. Back in Oslo he took up investigations of X-ray crystallography with Lars Vegard. With his help he could pursue this work at University of Berlin starting in the spring of 1914. That was at the same time as Einstein took up his new position there.

=== Theory of relativity ===
During the stay in Berlin it became clear that his main interests were in theoretical physics and electrodynamics in particular. This is central to Einstein's special theory of relativity and would define his future work back in Norway. From 1916 he took a new job as assistant in Trondheim, but had to resign after a year because of health problems. In the summer of 1917 he married Magnhild Andresen in Oslo and they had a child a year later. They had then moved back to his parents home in Berger where he worked alone on a larger treatise with the title Versuch einer elektrodynamischen Systematik. It was finished a year later in 1918 and he hoped that it could be used to obtain a doctors degree at the university. In the fall the same year he received treatment at a sanatorium for what turned out to be tuberculosis.

The faculty at the university in Oslo sent Jebsen's thesis for evaluation to Carl Wilhelm Oseen at the University of Uppsala. He had some critical comments with the result that it was approved for the more ordinary cand.real. degree. But Oseen had found this student so promising that he shortly thereafter was invited to work with him. Jebsen came to Uppsala in the fall of 1919 where he could follow lectures by Oseen on general relativity.

=== Jebsen–Birkhoff theorem ===
At that time it was natural to study the exact solution of Einstein's equations for the metric outside a static, spherical mass distribution found by Karl Schwarzschild in 1916. Jebsen set out to extend this achievement to the more general case for a spherical mass distribution that varied with time. This would be of relevance for pulsating stars. After a relative short time he came to the surprising result that the static Schwarzschild solution still gives the exact metric tensor outside the mass distribution. It means that such a spherical, pulsating star will not emit gravitational waves.

During the spring 1920 he hoped to get the results published through the Royal Swedish Academy of Sciences. This was met by some difficulties, but after the intervention by Oseen it was accepted for publication in a Swedish journal for the natural sciences where it appeared the following year.

His work did not seem to generate much interest. One reason can be that the Swedish journal was not so well known abroad. A couple of years later it was rediscovered by George David Birkhoff who included it in a popular science book he wrote. Thus it became known as "Birkhoff's theorem." The original discovery of Jebsen was pointed out first in 2005, and translated into English. From that time on it is now more often called the Jebsen–Birkhoff theorem. Most modern-day proofs are along the lines of the original Jebsen derivation.

=== Final years ===
Einstein came on a visit to Oslo in June 1920. He would give three public lectures about the theory of relativity after the invitation by the Student Society. Jebsen was also there, but it is not clear if he met him personally.

In the fall the same year Jebsen traveled with his family to Bolzano in northern Italy in order to find a milder climate to improve his deteriorating health. Here he wrote the first Norwegian presentation of the differential geometry used in general relativity. He also found time to write a popular book on Galileo Galilei and his struggle with the church. But his health did not improve and he died there on January 7, 1922. A few weeks later he was buried near his home in Norway.
