= Philippe G. Ciarlet =

French mathematician (born 1938)

Philippe Ciarlet
- Born: October 14, 1938 (age 88); Paris, France
- Education: École polytechnique École nationale des ponts et chaussées Case Institute of Technology
- Awards: Légion d'honneur
- Scientific career
- Fields: Mathematics
- Workplaces: Pierre and Marie Curie University; City University of Hong Kong
- Thesis: Variational methods for nonlinear boundary-value problems (1966)
- Doctoral advisor: Richard S. Varga

Philippe Gaston Ciarlet (born 14 October 1938) is a French mathematician, known particularly for his work on mathematical analysis of the finite element method. He has contributed also to elasticity, to the theory of plates and shells and differential geometry.

== Biography ==
Ciarlet is a former student of the École Polytechnique and the École des ponts et chaussées. He completed his PhD at Case Institute of Technology in Cleveland in 1966 under the supervision of Richard S. Varga. He also holds a doctorate in mathematical sciences from the Faculty of Sciences of Paris (doctorate under the supervision of Jacques-Louis Lions in 1971).

He headed the mathematics department of the Laboratoire central des Ponts et Chaussées (1966-1973) and was a lecturer at the École polytechnique (1967-1985), professor at the École nationale des Ponts et Chaussées (1978-1987), consultant at INRIA (1974-1994). From 1974 to 2002, he was a professor at the University of Pierre et Marie Curie where he directed the laboratory of Numerical Analysis from 1981 to 1992.

Ciarlet is Professor Emeritus at the University of Hong Kong, Professor at the City University of Hong Kong, Member of the Academy of Technology in 1989, Member of the French Academy of Sciences since 1991 (in the Mechanical and Computer Sciences section), Member of the Indian Academy of Sciences in 2001, Member of the European Academy of Sciences in 2003, Member of the World Academy of Sciences in 2007, Member of the Chinese Academy of Sciences in 2009, Member of the American Mathematical Society since 2012, and Member of the Hong-Kong Academy of Sciences in 2015.

== Scientific work ==
Numerical analysis of finite difference methods and general variational approximation methods: In his doctoral theses and early publications, Philippe Ciarlet made innovative contributions to the numerical approximation by variational methods of problems with non-linear monotonous boundaries, and introduced the concepts of discrete Green functions and the discrete maximum principle, which have since proved to be fundamental in numerical analysis.

Interpolation theory: Philippe Ciarlet has made innovative contributions, now "classical" to Lagrange and Hermite interpolation theory in R^n, notably through the introduction of the notion of multipoint Taylor formulas. This theory plays a fundamental role in establishing the convergence of finite element methods.

Numerical analysis of the finite element method: Philippe Ciarlet is well known for having made fundamental contributions in this field, including convergence analysis, the discrete maximum principle, uniform convergence, analysis of curved finite elements, numerical integration, non-conforming macroelements for plate problems, a mixed method for the biharmonic equation in fluid mechanics, and finite element methods for shell problems. His contributions and those of his collaborators can be found in his well-known book.

Plate modeling by asymptotic analysis and singular disturbance techniques: Philippe Ciarlet is also well known for his leading role in justifying two-dimensional models of linear and non-linear elastic plates from three-dimensional elasticity; in particular, he established convergence in the linear case, and justified two-dimensional non-linear models, including the von Kármán and Marguerre-von Karman equations, by the asymptotic development method.

Modeling, mathematical analysis and numerical simulation of "elastic multi-structures" including junctions: This is another entirely new field that Philippe Ciarlet has created and developed, by establishing the convergence of the three-dimensional solution towards that of a "multidimensional" model in the linear case, by justifying the limit conditions for embedding a plate.

Modeling and mathematical analysis of "general" shells: Philippe Ciarlet established the first existence theorems for two-dimensional linear shell models, such as those of W.T. Koiter and P.M. Naghdi, and justified the equations of the "bending" and "membrane" shell; he also established the first rigorous justification of the "shallow" two-dimensional linear shell equations and of Koiter equations, using asymptotic analysis techniques; he also obtained a new theory of existence for non-linear shell equations.

Non-linear elasticity: Philippe Ciarlet proposed a new energy function that is polyconvex (as defined by John Ball), and has proven to be very effective because it is "adjustable" to any given isotropic elastic material; he has also made important and innovative contributions to the modelling of contact and non-interpenetration in three-dimensional non-linear elasticity. He also proposed and justified a new non-linear Koiter-type model for non-linearly elastic hulls.

Non-linear inequalities of Korn on a surface: Philippe Ciarlet gave several new proofs of the fundamental theorem of surface theory, concerning the reconstruction of a surface according to its first and second fundamental forms. He was the first to show that a surface continuously varies according to its two fundamental forms, for different topologies, notably by introducing a new idea, that of non-linear Korn inequalities on a surface, another notion that he essentially created and developed with his collaborators.

Functional analysis: Philippe Ciarlet established weak forms of Poincaré's lemma and conditions of compatibility of Saint Venant, in Sobolev's spaces with negative exponents; he established that there are deep relationships between Jacques-Louis Lions' lemma, Nečas's inequality, Rham's theorem, and Bogovskii's theorem, which provide new methods to establish these results.

Intrinsic methods in linearized elasticity: Philippe Ciarlet has developed a new field, that of the mathematical justification of "intrinsic" methods in linearized elasticity, where the linearized metric tensor and the linearized tensor of curvature change are the new, and only, unknowns: This approach, whether for three-dimensional elasticity or for plate and shell theories, requires an entirely new approach, based mainly on the compatibility conditions of Saint-Venant and Donati in Sobolev spaces.

Intrinsic methods in non-linear elasticity: Philippe Ciarlet has developed a new field, that of the mathematical justification of "intrinsic" methods in non-linear elasticity. This approach makes it possible to obtain new existence theorems in three-dimensional non-linear elasticity.

Teaching and research books: Philippe Ciarlet has written several textbooks that are now "classics ", as well as several "reference" research books.

== Honours and awards ==
National Order of the Legion of Honour of France:

- Chevalier: 7 April 1999
- Officier: 5 June 2012

Member or Foreign Member of the following Academies :

- Academia Europaea, 1989
- Academy of Sciences, 1991
- Romanian Academy, 1996
- Academy of Technologies, 2004
- National Academy of Sciences of India, 2001
- European Academy of Sciences, 2003
- World Academy of Sciences (TWAS), 2007
- Chinese Academy of Sciences, 2009
- Hong Kong Academy of Sciences, 2015

Prizes

- Poncelet Prize, Academy of Sciences, 1981
- Grand Prize (Jaffé Prize), Academy of Sciences, 1989
- Alexander von Humboldt Research Fellowship, 1996
- Gold Medal, University of Santiago de Compostela, 1997
- Shanghai Prize for International Cooperation in Science and Technology, 2006

Academic awards

- Fellow of the Industrial and Applied Mathematics Society (SIAM), 2009
- Fellow of the Hong Kong Institute of Science, 2011
- Fellow of the American Mathematical Society (AMS), 2013
- Senior Fellow of the Institute of Advanced Study at the City University of Hong Kong, 2015
- "Honorary Professor", Fudan University, Shanghai, 1994
- "Senior Member", Institut Universitaire de France, 1996-2002
- "Honorary Professor", Transilvania University, Braşov, 1998
- Doctor honoris causa of the University of Ovidius, Constant¸a, 1999.
- Professor Emeritus, Pierre and Marie Curie University, 2002
- Doctor honoris causa, University of Bucharest, 2005
- "Honorary Professor", Xi'an Jiaotong University, 2006
- Doctor honoris causa, University of Craiova, 2007
- Doctor honoris causa, Politehnica University of Bucharest, 2007
- Doctor Honoris Causa, university "Alexandru loan Cuza" from laşi, 2012
- Honorary Professor, South China University of Technology, 2019
- Honorary Professor, Chongqing University, 2019.
