= WDD =

WDD or Wdd may refer to:

- World Diabetes Day, the global awareness campaign
- When Dream and Day Unite, the debut studio album by Dream Theater
- wdd, the ISO 639-3 code for Wanzi language
- Walter Donald Douglas, an American business executive
- Woodside station (LIRR), the station code WDD
- Widdrington railway station, the station code WDD
- Weakly diagonally dominant
- Western Development Division
