= Nekrasov matrix =

In mathematics, a Nekrasov matrix or generalised Nekrasov matrix is a type of diagonally dominant matrix (i.e. one in which the diagonal elements are in some way greater than some function of the non-diagonal elements). Specifically if A is a generalised Nekrasov matrix, its diagonal elements are non-zero and the diagonal elements also satisfy, $a_{ii} > R_i(A)$ where, $R_i(A) = \sum_{j=1}^{i-1} |a_{ij}|\frac{R_j(A)}{|a_{jj}|}+\sum_{j=i+1}^n |a_{ij}|$.
