= Birkhoff's theorem (electromagnetism) =

In physics, in the context of electromagnetism, Birkhoff's theorem concerns spherically symmetric static solutions of Maxwell's field equations of electromagnetism.

The theorem is due to George D. Birkhoff. It states that any spherically symmetric solution of the source-free Maxwell equations is necessarily static. Pappas (1984) gives two proofs of this theorem, using Maxwell's equations and Lie derivatives. It is a limiting case of Birkhoff's theorem (relativity) by taking the flat metric without backreaction.

== Derivation from Maxwell's equations ==
The source-free Maxwell's equations state that

$$\begin{align}
\nabla \times \mathbf{E} &= -\frac{\partial\mathbf B}{\partial t},\\
\nabla \times \mathbf{B} &= \mu\varepsilon \frac{\partial\mathbf E}{\partial t}.
\end{align}$$

Since the fields are spherically symmetric, they depend only on the radial distance in spherical coordinates. The field is purely radial as non-radial components cannot be invariant under rotation, which would be necessary for symmetry. Therefore, we can rewrite the fields as

$$\begin{align}
\mathbf{E}(\mathbf{r},t) &= E(r, t)\mathbf{\hat{r}},\\
\mathbf{B}(\mathbf{r},t) &= B(r, t)\mathbf{\hat{r}}.
\end{align}$$

We find that the curls must be zero, since,

$$\begin{align}
\nabla \times \mathbf{E} &= \nabla \times E(r,t) \mathbf{\hat{r}} = 0,\\
\nabla \times \mathbf{B} &= \nabla \times B(r,t) \mathbf{\hat{r}} = 0.
\end{align}$$

Moreover, we can substitute into the source-free Maxwell equations, to find that

$$\begin{align}
\mu\varepsilon \frac{\partial\mathbf E}{\partial t} &= 0,\\
-\frac{\partial\mathbf B}{\partial t} &= 0.
\end{align}$$

Simply dividing by the constant coefficients, we find that both the magnetic and electric field are static

$$\begin{align}
\frac{\partial\mathbf E}{\partial t} &= 0,\\
\frac{\partial\mathbf B}{\partial t} &= 0.
\end{align}$$

== Derivation using Lie derivatives ==
Defining the 1-form $E$ and 2-form $B$ in $\R^3$ as:

$$\begin{align}
E &= E_i dr_i\\
B &= \epsilon_{ijk} B_i dr_j \wedge dr_k
\end{align}$$

Using the Hodge star operator, we can rewrite Maxwell's Equations with these forms as

$$\begin{align}
dB &= 0\\
d{\star E} &= 0\\
\star d{\star E} &= \dot{E}\\
dE &= -\dot{B}
\end{align}$$.

The spherical symmetry condition requires that the Lie derivatives of $E$ and $B$ with respect to the vector field $V$ that represents their rotations are zero

$$\begin{align}
V_i&=\epsilon_{ijk}r_j\frac{\partial}{\partial{r_k}}\\
\mathcal{L}_V(E) &= 0\\
\mathcal{L}_V(B) &= 0.
\end{align}$$

By the definition of the Lie derivative as the directional derivative along $V$

$$\begin{align}
V_j (r_i) &= \epsilon_{jki} r_k\\
0 &= \mathcal{L}_V E_i dr_i + E_i \mathcal{L}_V dr_i\\
&= V_j (E_i) dr_i + E_i V_j (dr_i)\\
&= V_j (E_i) dr_i + E_i d (V_j (r_i))\\
&= V_j (E_i) dr_i + E_i \epsilon_{jki} dr_k\\
&= V_j (E_i) dr_i + \epsilon_{jki} E_k dr_i\\
V_j (E_i) &= - \epsilon_{jki} E_k\\
\end{align}$$.

Therefore, $E$ is equivalent to $r$ under rotation and we can write for some function $g$

$E = g(r^2, t) r_i dr_i$.

Because the product of the components of the vector are just its length

$r_i r_i = r^2$.

And substituting back into our equation and rewriting for a function $f$

$E = df(r^2,t)$.

Taking the exterior derivative of $E$, we find by definition that,

$dE=0$.

And using our Maxwell equation that $dE = -\dot{B}$,

$\dot{B}=0$.

Thus, we find that the magnetic field is static. Similarly, using the second rotational invariance equation, we can find that the electric field is static. Therefore, the solution must be static.
