= Birkhoff's theorem (equational logic) =

Theorem in equational logic

In logic, Birkhoff's theorem in equational logic states that an equality t = u is a semantic consequence of a set of equalities E, if and only if t = u can be proven from the set of equalities. It is named after Garrett Birkhoff.
