= Birkhoff's theorem (relativity) =

Statement of spherically symmetric spacetimes

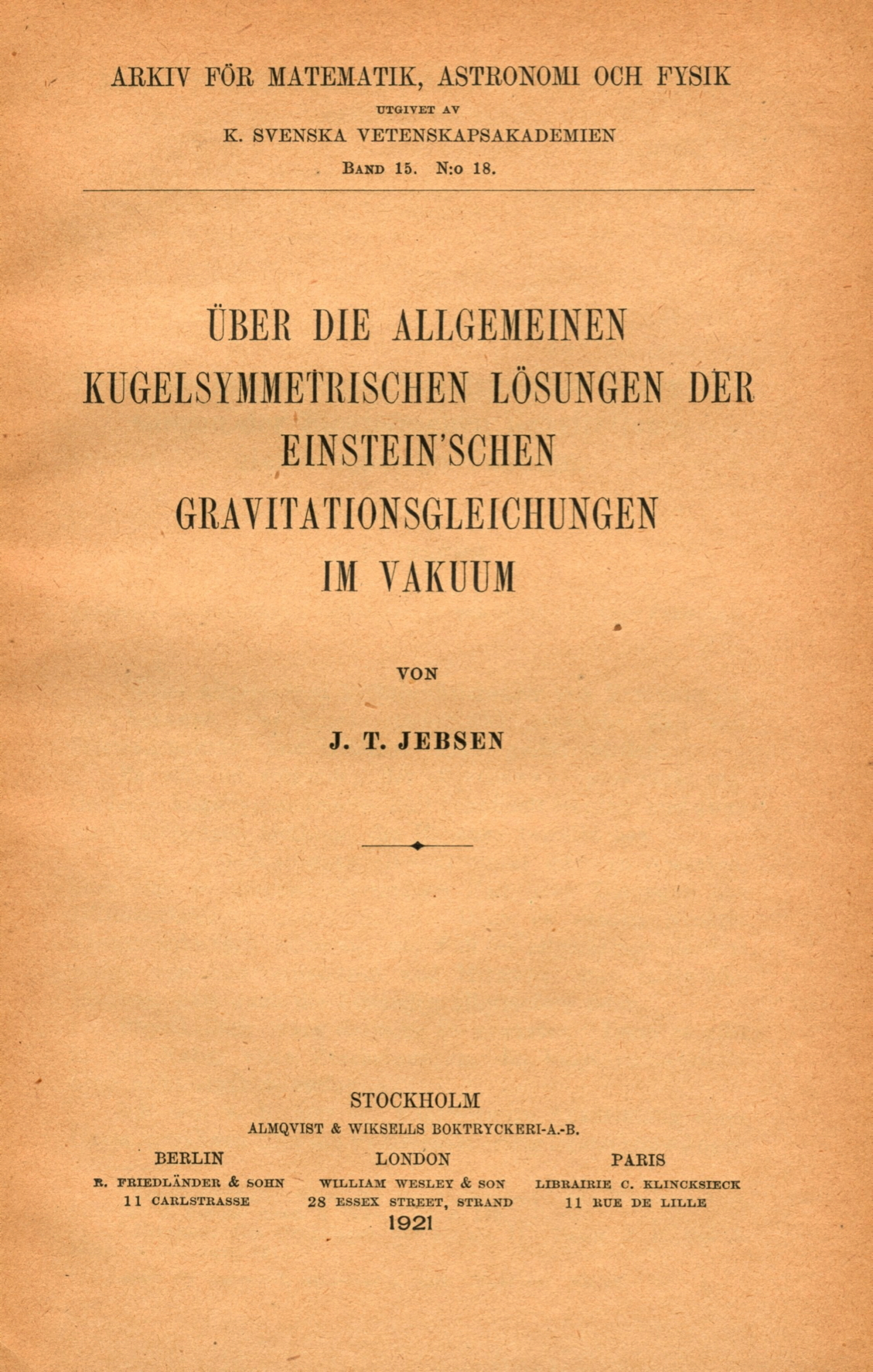
Front page of Arkiv för Matematik, Astronomi och Fysik where Jebsen's work was published

In general relativity, Birkhoff–Jebsen's theorem states that any spherically symmetric solution of the vacuum field equations must be static and asymptotically flat. This means that the exterior solution (i.e. the spacetime outside of a spherical, nonrotating, gravitating body) must be given by the Schwarzschild metric. The converse of the theorem is true and is called Israel's theorem. The converse is not true in Newtonian gravity.

The theorem was first proven by Jørg Tofte Jebsen in 1921 and rediscovered in 1923 by George David Birkhoff (author of another famous Birkhoff theorem, the pointwise ergodic theorem which lies at the foundation of ergodic theory). Israel's theorem was proved by Werner Israel.

== Intuitive rationale ==
The intuitive idea of Birkhoff's theorem is that a spherically symmetric gravitational field should be produced by some massive object at the origin; if there were another concentration of mass–energy somewhere else, this would disturb the spherical symmetry, so we can expect the solution to represent an isolated object. That is, the field should vanish at large distances, which is (partly) what we mean by saying the solution is asymptotically flat. Thus, this part of the theorem is just what we would expect from the fact that general relativity reduces to Newtonian gravitation in the Newtonian limit.

== Implications ==
The conclusion that the exterior field must also be stationary is more surprising, and has an interesting consequence. Suppose we have a spherically symmetric star of fixed mass which is experiencing spherical pulsations. Then Birkhoff's theorem says that the exterior geometry must be Schwarzschild; the only effect of the pulsation is to change the location of the stellar surface. This means that a spherically pulsating star cannot emit gravitational waves, which requires at least a mass quadrupole structure.

== Generalizations ==
Birkhoff's theorem can be generalized: any spherically symmetric and asymptotically flat solution of the Einstein/Maxwell field equations, without $\Lambda$, must be static, so the exterior geometry of a spherically symmetric charged star must be given by the Reissner–Nordström electrovacuum. In the Einstein-Maxwell theory, there exist spherically symmetric but not asymptotically flat solutions, such as the Bertotti-Robinson universe.

== See also ==
- Birkhoff's theorem (electromagnetism)
- Newman–Janis algorithm, a complexification technique for finding exact solutions to the Einstein field equations
- Shell theorem in Newtonian gravity
- Quadrupole formula
