= Symmetric successive over-relaxation =

In applied mathematics, symmetric successive over-relaxation (SSOR), is a preconditioner.

If the original matrix can be split into diagonal, lower and upper triangular as $A=D+L+L^\mathsf{T}$ then the SSOR preconditioner matrix is defined as $M=(D+L) D^{-1} (D+L)^\mathsf{T}$

It can also be parametrised by $\omega$ as follows. $M(\omega)={\omega\over{2-\omega}} \left ( {1\over\omega} D + L \right ) D^{-1} \left ( {1\over\omega} D + L\right)^\mathsf{T}$

== See also ==
- Successive over-relaxation
