= Richard S. Varga =

American mathematician (1928–2022)

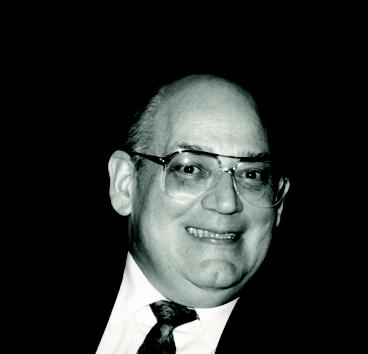
- Born: Richard Steven Varga; October 9, 1928; Cleveland, Ohio, US
- Died: February 25, 2022 (aged 93)
- Education: Case Institute of Technology; Harvard University
- Known for: Numerical analysis Experimental mathematics Complex analysis 1/9th Conjecture; Padé approximation Matrix theory
- Scientific career
- Fields: Applied Mathematics
- Workplaces: Bettis Atomic Power Laboratory; Case Western Reserve University; Kent State University
- Doctoral advisor: Joseph L. Walsh
- Doctoral students: Philippe G. Ciarlet

Richard Steven Varga (October 9, 1928 - February 25, 2022) was an American mathematician who specialized in numerical analysis and linear algebra. He was an Emeritus University Professor of Mathematical Sciences at Kent State University and an adjunct Professor at Case Western Reserve University. Varga was known for his contributions to many areas of mathematics, including matrix analysis, complex analysis, approximation theory, and scientific computation. He was the author of the classic textbook Matrix Iterative Analysis. Varga served as the Editor-in-Chief of the journal Electronic Transactions on Numerical Analysis (ETNA).

== Birth and education ==
Richard Varga was born in Cleveland, Ohio of Hungarian-born parents in 1928. He obtained a bachelor's degree in mathematics from Case Institute of Technology (present Case Western Reserve University) in 1950. Varga was a member of the collegiate wrestling team of Case.

Following the advice of Professor Max Morris at Case, Varga joined Harvard University for the master's degree and obtained an A.M. in mathematics. Continuing his doctoral work at Harvard under the supervision of Joseph L. Walsh, Varga worked on the theory of rational approximation of complex analytic functions. Varga received his Ph.D. degree in 1954 with a dissertation Properties of a Special Set of Entire Functions and their Respective Partial Sums.

While at Harvard, Varga also studied with Garrett Birkhoff, who later came to collaborate with Varga in research both on iterative methods for differential equations and on positive matrices (and positive operators on partially ordered vector spaces).

== Career ==
From 1954 until 1960, Varga worked for Bettis Atomic Power Laboratory in Pittsburgh. In 1960 he returned to Case Institute of Technology as a professor of mathematics and remained there for the next nine years. He then moved to Kent State University as University Professor of mathematics. At Kent Varga has held numerous academic positions, including director (1980–1988) and research director (1988–2006) of the Institute for Computational Mathematics. His work includes numerical analysis—particularly iterative methods in numerical linear algebra, matrix theory, and differential equations—complex approximation theory, particularly Padé approximation (often with Edward B. Saff, Jr.)—and analytic number theory, including high-precision calculations related to the Riemann hypothesis. He is also known for advocating experimentation in mathematics, and for writing a monograph surveying his contributions on scientific computing to resolve open problems and conjectures.

== Awards and honors ==
In 2012 he became a fellow of the American Mathematical Society.

== See also ==
- Matrix splitting
