= Newman–Janis algorithm =

Technique to find exact solutions to Einstein field equations

In general relativity, the Newman–Janis algorithm (NJA) is a complexification technique for finding exact solutions to the Einstein field equations. In 1964, Newman and Janis showed that the Kerr metric could be obtained from the Schwarzschild metric by means of a coordinate transformation and allowing the radial coordinate to take on complex values. Originally, no clear reason for why the algorithm works was known.

In 1998, Drake and Szekeres gave a detailed explanation of the success of the algorithm and proved the uniqueness of certain solutions. In particular, the only perfect fluid solution generated by NJA is the Kerr metric and the only Petrov type D solution is the Kerr–Newman metric.

The algorithm works well on ƒ(R) and Einstein–Maxwell–Dilaton theories, but doesn't return expected results on Braneworld and Born–Infield theories.

== See also ==
- Birkhoff's theorem (relativity)
