= Eduardo Héctor Zarantonello =

Argentine mathematician

Eduardo Héctor Zarantonello (1918–2010) was an Argentine mathematician working on analysis. His doctorate was awarded by the Universidad Nacional de La Plata.
