= Comparison matrix =

In linear algebra, let A = (a_{ij}) be a n × n complex matrix. The comparison matrix M(A) = (α_{ij}) of complex matrix A is defined as

$$\alpha_{ij} = \begin{cases}
-|a_{ij}| &\text{if } i \neq j,   \\
|a_{ij}| &\text{if } i=j.   \end{cases}$$

== See also ==
- Hurwitz-stable matrix
- P-matrix
- Perron–Frobenius theorem
- Z-matrix
- L-matrix
- M-matrix
- H-matrix (iterative method)
