= H-matrix (iterative method) =

In mathematics, an H-matrix is a matrix whose comparison matrix is an M-matrix. It is useful in iterative methods.

Definition: Let A = (a_{ij}) be a n × n complex matrix. Then comparison matrix M(A) of complex matrix A is defined as M(A) = α_{ij} where α_{ij} = −|A_{ij}| for all i ≠ j, 1 ≤ i,j ≤ n and α_{ij} = |A_{ij}| for all i = j, 1 ≤ i,j ≤ n. If M(A) is a M-matrix, A is a H-matrix.

Invertible H-matrix guarantees convergence of Gauss–Seidel iterative methods.

== See also ==
- Hurwitz-stable matrix
- P-matrix
- Perron–Frobenius theorem
- Z-matrix
- L-matrix
- M-matrix
- Comparison matrix
