= Monotone matrix =

A real square matrix $A$ is monotone (in the sense of Collatz) if for all real vectors $v$, $Av \geq 0$ implies $v \geq 0$, where $\geq$ is the element-wise order on $\mathbb{R}^n$.

== Properties ==
A monotone matrix is nonsingular.

Proof: Let $A$ be a monotone matrix and assume there exists $x \ne 0$ with $Ax = 0$. Then, by monotonicity, $x \geq 0$ and $-x \geq 0$, and hence $x = 0$. $\square$

Let $A$ be a real square matrix. $A$ is monotone if and only if $A^{-1} \geq 0$.

Proof: Suppose $A$ is monotone. Denote by $x$ the $i$-th column of $A^{-1}$. Then, $Ax$ is the $i$-th standard basis vector, and hence $x \geq 0$ by monotonicity. For the reverse direction, suppose $A$ admits an inverse such that $A^{-1} \geq 0$. Then, if $Ax \geq 0$, $x = A^{-1} Ax \geq A^{-1} 0 = 0$, and hence $A$ is monotone. $\square$

== Examples ==
The matrix $\left( \begin{smallmatrix} 1&-2\\ 0&1 \end{smallmatrix} \right)$ is monotone, with inverse $\left( \begin{smallmatrix} 1&2\\ 0&1 \end{smallmatrix} \right)$. In fact, this matrix is an M-matrix (i.e., a monotone L-matrix).

Note, however, that not all monotone matrices are M-matrices. An example is $\left( \begin{smallmatrix} -1&3\\ 2&-4 \end{smallmatrix} \right)$, whose inverse is $\left( \begin{smallmatrix} 2&3/2\\ 1&1/2 \end{smallmatrix} \right)$.

== See also ==
- M-matrix
- Weakly chained diagonally dominant matrix
