= Stieltjes matrix =

In mathematics, particularly matrix theory, a Stieltjes matrix, named after Thomas Joannes Stieltjes, is a real symmetric positive definite matrix with nonpositive off-diagonal entries. A Stieltjes matrix is necessarily an M-matrix. Every n×n Stieltjes matrix is invertible to a nonsingular symmetric nonnegative matrix, though the converse of this statement is not true in general for n > 2.

From the above definition, a Stieltjes matrix is a symmetric invertible Z-matrix whose eigenvalues have positive real parts. As it is a Z-matrix, its off-diagonal entries are less than or equal to zero.

== See also ==
- Hurwitz-stable matrix
- Metzler matrix
