= H-matrix =

H-matrix can refer to various kinds of matrices denoted by the letter H:

- H-matrix, a matrix whose comparison matrix is an M-matrix
- Hadamard matrix, a square matrix whose entries are either +1 or −1 and whose rows are mutually orthogonal
- Hamiltonian matrix, a 2n × 2n matrix A such that JA is symmetric, where J is the skew-symmetric matrix
- Hankel matrix, a square matrix in which each ascending skew-diagonal from left to right is constant
- Hasse–Witt matrix
- Hat matrix
- Hermitian matrix, a complex square matrix that is equal to its own conjugate transpose
- Hessenberg matrix, a square matrix that has either zero entries below the first subdiagonal, zero entries above the first superdiagonal, or both
- Hessian matrix, a square matrix of second-order partial derivatives of a scalar-valued function, or scalar field, that describes the local curvature of a function of many variables
- Hierarchical matrix, a data-sparse approximation of a non-sparse matrix
- Hilbert matrix, a square matrix with entries being the unit fractions
- Hollow matrix, a square matrix or related classes of matrix
- Routh–Hurwitz matrix, a square matrix constructed with coefficients of a real polynomial
- Parity-check matrix is often called H-matrix.
