= Stephen Hilbert =

American mathematician

- Born: Brooklyn, New York, U.S.
- Education: University of Maryland (PhD); University of Notre Dame (BS)
- Known for: Bramble–Hilbert lemma
- Scientific career
- Fields: Mathematics
- Workplaces: Ithaca College; Cornell University

Stephen R. Hilbert is an American mathematician best known as co-author of the Bramble–Hilbert lemma, which he published with James H. Bramble in 1970. Hilbert's area of specialty is numerical analysis. He has been a professor of mathematics at Ithaca College since 1968. Additionally, he taught mathematics at Cornell University as a visiting program professor during the 2003–2004 academic year.

== Early life and education ==
Hilbert was born in Brooklyn, New York. As a teenager, he attended Regis High School in New York City. He received his BS in mathematics from the University of Notre Dame in 1964 and his PhD in applied mathematics from the University of Maryland in 1969. He completed his dissertation, Numerical Solutions of Elliptic Partial Differential Equations, with Bramble as his advisor.

== Awards and honors ==
- Distinguished College Teaching of Mathematics Award – 1994 – Seaway Section of the Mathematical Association of America
- Dana Teaching Fellow – 1985
- Dana Teaching Fellow – 1982
- Outstanding Faculty Award – 1979 – School of Humanities and Sciences, Ithaca College

== Publications ==
- Barron's GMAT. Jaffe, Eugene D., and Stephen Hilbert, 2009, Barron's Educational Series, ISBN 978-0-7641-3993-2, 497 pgs
- Calculus: An Active Approach with Projects. Hilbert, Stephen, et al., 1993–1994, John Wiley & Sons; Reissued 2010 by Mathematical Association of America, ISBN 978-0-88385-763-2, 307 pgs
- Estimation of Linear Functionals on Sobolev Spaces with Application to Fourier Transforms and Spline Interpolation. Bramble, James H., and Stephen R. Hilbert. SIAM Journal on Numerical Analysis (Society for Industrial and Applied Mathematics) (Vol. 7, No. 1 (Mar., 1970)): 112–124.
- A Mollifier Useful for Approximations in Sobolev Spaces and Some Applications to Approximating Solutions of Differential Equations. Hilbert, Stephen. Mathematics of Computation (American Mathematical Society) (Vol. 27, No. 121 (Jan., 1973)): 81–89.
