= Joel Lee Brenner =

American mathematician

- Born: August 2, 1912; Boston
- Died: November 14, 1997 (aged 85); Palo Alto, California
- Citizenship: United States
- Known for: Linear algebra Matrix theory
- Scientific career
- Fields: Mathematics
- Thesis: The Linear Homogeneous Group Modulo P (1936)
- Doctoral advisor: Garrett Birkhoff

Joel Lee Brenner (August 2, 1912 – November 14, 1997) was an American mathematician who specialized in matrix theory, linear algebra, and group theory. He is known as the translator of several popular Russian texts. He was a teaching professor at some dozen colleges and universities and was a Senior Mathematician at Stanford Research Institute from 1956 to 1968. He published over one hundred scholarly papers, 35 with coauthors, and wrote book reviews.

== Academic career ==
In 1930 Brenner earned a B.A. degree with major in chemistry from Harvard University. In graduate study there he was influenced by Hans Brinkmann, Garrett Birkhoff, and Marshall Stone. He was granted the Ph.D. in February 1936. Brenner later described some of his reminiscences of his student days at Harvard and of the state of American mathematics in the 1930s in an article for American Mathematical Monthly.

In 1951 Brenner published his findings about matrices with quaternion entries. He developed the idea of a characteristic root of a quaternion matrix (an eigenvalue) and shows that they must exist. He also shows that a quaternion matrix is unitarily-equivalent to a triangular matrix.

In 1956 he became a Senior Mathematician at Stanford Research Institute. Brenner, in collaboration with Donald W. Bushaw and S. Evanusa, assisted in the translation and revision of Felix Gantmacher's Applications of the Theory of Matrices (1959).

Brenner translated Nikolaj Nikolaevič Krasovskii's book Stability of motion: applications of Lyapunov's second method to differential systems and equations with delay (1963). He also translated and edited the book Problems in differential equations by Aleksei Fedorovich Filippov.

Brenner translated Problems in Higher Algebra by D. K. Faddeev and I.S. Sominiski. The exercises in this book covered complex numbers, roots of unity, as well as some linear algebra and abstract algebra.

In 1959 Brenner generalized propositions by Alexander Ostrowski and G. B. Price on minors of a diagonally dominant matrix. His work is credited with stimulating a reawakening of interest in the permanent of a matrix.

One of the challenges in linear algebra is to find the eigenvalues and eigenvectors of a square matrix of complex numbers. In 1931 S. A. Gershgorin described geometric bounds on the eigenvectors in terms of the matrix elements. This result known as the Gershgorin circle theorem has been used as a basis for extension. In 1964 Brenner reported on Theorems of Gersgorin Type. In 1967 at University of Wisconsin—Madison, working in the Mathematics Research Center, he produced a technical report New root-location theorems for partitioned matrices.

In 1968 Brenner, following Alston Householder, published "Gersgorin theorems by Householder’s proof". In 1970 he published the survey article (21 references) "Gersgorin theorems, regularity theorems, and bounds for determinants of partitioned matrices". The article was extended with "Some determinantal identities".

In 1971 Brenner extended his geometry of the spectrum of a square complex matrix deeper into abstract algebra with his paper "Regularity theorems and Gersgorin theorems for matrices over rings with valuation". He writes, "Theorems can be extended to non-commutative domains, in particular to quaternion matrices. Secondly, the ring of polynomials has a valuation ... a different type of regularity ..."

== Collaborations ==
Joel Lee Brenner was a member of the American Mathematical Society from 1936.

Beasley relates that he

was a graduate student and [Brenner] was visiting the University of British Columbia in 1966-67. Shortly after arriving at UBC, Joel circulated a memo to all the graduate students, informing them that he had several open problems in various areas of mathematics and would share them with willing students. Hoping to get a problem in group theory that I might work into a thesis, I went to his office and inquired about the problems. He presented me the Van der Waerden conjecture, which he informed me would be quite difficult, and after defining the permanent for me sent me off with several problems concerning the permanent function. His encouragement and enthusiasm persevered through several "proofs" of the Van der Waerden conjecture, and soon some of the less well-known problems had been solved. He would always tell me how a proposed attack would work and leave me to fight out the details. Those exchanges led to the publication of my first paper, and I became his thirteenth coauthor. By the time Joel had left UBC in the spring of 1967, I was firmly entrenched in matrix theory.

In 1981 Brenner and Roger Lyndon collaborated to polish an idea due to H. W. Kuhn for proving the fundamental theorem of algebra. In the solution by Eric S. Rosenthal to a problem in the American Mathematical Monthly posted by Harry D. Ruderman, Kuhn's work from 1974 was cited. A query was made and prompted an article by Brenner and Lyndon. The version of the fundamental theorem stated was as follows:

Let P(z) be a non-constant polynomial with complex coefficients. Then there is a positive number S > 0, depending only on P, with the following property:

for every δ > 0 there is a complex number z such that |z| ≤ S and |P(z)| < δ .

Brenner ultimately acquired 35 coauthors in his publications.

=== Alternating group ===
Given an ordered set Ω with n elements, the even permutations on it determine the alternating group A_{n}. In 1960 Brenner proposed the following research problem in group theory: For which A_{n} does there exist an element a_{n} such that every element g is similar to a commutator of a_{n}? Brenner states that the property is true for 4 < n < 10; in symbols it may be expressed

$$\exists a_n \ \forall g \ \exists u \ \exists y \ (g = u^{-1}(a_n y a_n^{-1} y^{-1}) u) .$$

The alternating groups are simple groups, and in 1971 Brenner began a series of articles titled "Covering theorems for finite simple groups". He was interested in the cycle type of cyclic permutations, and when A_{n} ⊂ C C, where C is a conjugacy class of a certain type.

In 1977 he posed the question, "What permutations in A_{n} can be expressed as a product of permutations of periods k and l" ?

== Works ==
In 1987 Linear Algebra and its Applications published a list of 111 articles by J.L. Brenner, and the four books he translated.

=== Research ===
- J. Brenner (1964). "The problem of unitary equivalence". Acta Mathematica. 86 (1): 297–308. doi:10.1007/BF02392670.
- Joel L. Brenner (1964). "A Pair of Combinatorial Identities". SIAM Review. 6 (2): 177. Bibcode:1964SIAMR...6..177B. doi:10.1137/1006041.
- J. L. Brenner (1964). "The Jordan normal form; decomposition theorem for modules". Archiv der Mathematik. 15 (1): 276–281. doi:10.1007/BF01589198. S2CID 122353256.
- C. M. Ablow; J. L. Brenner (1963). "Roots and Canonical Forms for Circulant Matrices". Transactions of the American Mathematical Society. 107 (2): 360. doi:10.2307/1993900. JSTOR 1993900.
- Joel Brenner (1963). "On Commutative Rotations". SIAM Review. 5 (2): 156. Bibcode:1963SIAMR...5..156B. doi:10.1137/1005039.
- J. L. Brenner (1963). "g-circulant matrices over a field of prime characteristic". Illinois Journal of Mathematics. 7 (1963): 174–179. doi:10.1215/ijm/1255637490.
- C. Brenner; J. L. Brenner (1962). "The popularity of small integers as primitive roots". Numerische Mathematik. 4 (1): 336–342. doi:10.1007/BF01386328. S2CID 120118613.
- J. L. Brenner; F. T. Smith (1962). "On a Property of a Unitary Matrix". SIAM Review. 4 (4): 395. Bibcode:1962SIAMR...4..395B. doi:10.1137/1004094.
- J. L. Brenner (1962). "Mahler matrices and the equation QA = AQ^{m}". Duke Mathematical Journal. 29 (1962): 13–28. doi:10.1215/S0012-7094-62-02903-4.
- J. L. Brenner (1962). "A new property of the Jacobi symbol". Duke Mathematical Journal. 29 (1962): 29–31. doi:10.1215/S0012-7094-62-02904-6.
- J. L. Brenner (1961). "Expanded Matrices from Matrices with Complex Elements". SIAM Review. 3 (2): 165–166. Bibcode:1961SIAMR...3..165B. doi:10.1137/1003028.
- J. L. Brenner (1961). "Characteristic polynomials of special matrices". Archiv der Mathematik. 12 (1): 298–300. doi:10.1007/BF01650563. S2CID 119729221.
- J. L. Brenner; G. E. Latta (1960). "The Theory of Satellite Orbits, Based on a New CoOrdinate System". Proceedings of the Royal Society A. 258 (1295): 470–485. Bibcode:1960RSPSA.258..470B. doi:10.1098/rspa.1960.0201. S2CID 129764735.
- J. L. Brenner (1957). "Bounds for Determinants. II". Proceedings of the American Mathematical Society. 8 (3): 532–534. doi:10.2307/2033510. JSTOR 2033510.
- J. L. Brenner (1957). "Errata: Bounds for Determinants. II". Proceedings of the American Mathematical Society. 8 (6): 1160. doi:10.2307/2032700. JSTOR 2032700.
- J. L. Brenner (1957). "Bounds for determinants. II". Proceedings of the American Mathematical Society. 8 (3): 532–534. doi:10.1090/S0002-9939-1957-0086043-3.
- J. L. Brenner (1956). "Neuer Beweis eines Satzes von Taussky und Geiringer". Archiv der Mathematik. 7 (4): 274–275. doi:10.1007/BF01900302. S2CID 122280948.
- J. L. Brenner (1954). "Orthogonal matrices of modular polynomials". Duke Mathematical Journal. 21 (1954): 225–231. doi:10.1215/S0012-7094-54-02123-7.
- J. L. Brenner (1954). "A Bound for a Determinant with Dominant Main Diagonal". Proceedings of the American Mathematical Society. 5 (4): 631–634. doi:10.2307/2032049. JSTOR 2032049.
- J. L. Brenner (1954). "A bound for a determinant with dominant main diagonal". Proceedings of the American Mathematical Society. 5 (4): 631–634. doi:10.1090/S0002-9939-1954-0063341-8.

=== Book reviews ===
- Joel Brenner (1955). "Linear operators. Spectral theory and some other applications by R.G. Cooke". Bulletin of the American Mathematical Society. 61 (4): 371–373. doi:10.1090/S0002-9904-1955-09964-6.
- J. L. Brenner (1959). "Matrix calculus (E. Bodewig)". Bulletin of the American Mathematical Society. 65 (2): 109–110. doi:10.1090/S0002-9904-1959-10305-0.
- Joel Brenner (1962). "Linear Algebra and Group Theory (R.A. Silverman & V.I. Smirnov editors)". SIAM Review. 4 (2). doi:10.1137/1004046.
- Joel Brenner (1962). "Lectures on Linear Algebra (I. M. Gel'fand)". SIAM Review. 4 (1): 55. doi:10.1137/1004018.
- J. L. Brenner (1964). "Introduction to Linear Algebra (Frank M. Stewart)". SIAM Review. 6 (2). doi:10.1137/1006055.
