= Plemmons =

Plemmons is a surname. Notable people with the surname include:

- Robert J. Plemmons (1938–2026), American mathematician
- Zene Plemmons (born 1982), Mexican-American photojournalist

== See also ==
- Plemons, another surname
