= Metzler matrix =

Square matrix whose off-diagonal entries are nonnegative

In mathematics, a Metzler matrix is a matrix in which all the off-diagonal components are nonnegative (equal to or greater than zero):

$$\forall_{i\neq j}\, x_{ij} \geq 0.$$

It is named after the American economist Lloyd Metzler.

Metzler matrices appear in stability analysis of time delayed differential equations and positive linear dynamical systems. Their properties can be derived by applying the properties of nonnegative matrices to matrices of the form M + aI, where M is a Metzler matrix.

== Definition and terminology ==
In mathematics, especially linear algebra, a matrix is called Metzler, quasipositive (or quasi-positive) or essentially nonnegative if all of its elements are non-negative except for those on the main diagonal, which are unconstrained. That is, a Metzler matrix is any matrix A which satisfies

$$A=(a_{ij});\quad a_{ij}\geq 0, \quad i\neq j.$$

Metzler matrices are also sometimes referred to as $Z^{(-)}$-matrices, as a Z-matrix is equivalent to a negated quasipositive matrix.

== Properties ==
The exponential of a Metzler (or quasipositive) matrix is a nonnegative matrix because of the corresponding property for the exponential of a nonnegative matrix. This is natural, once one observes that the generator matrices of continuous-time Markov chains are always Metzler matrices, and that probability distributions are always non-negative.

A Metzler matrix has an eigenvector in the nonnegative orthant because of the corresponding property for nonnegative matrices.

== Relevant theorems ==
- Perron–Frobenius theorem

== See also ==
- Nonnegative matrices
- Delay differential equation
- M-matrix
- P-matrix
- Q-matrix, a specific kind of Metzler matrix
- Z-matrix
- Hurwitz-stable matrix
- Stochastic matrix
- Positive systems

== Bibliography ==
- Berman, Abraham; Plemmons, Robert J. (1994). Nonnegative Matrices in the Mathematical Sciences. SIAM. doi:10.1137/1.9781611971262. ISBN 0-89871-321-8. OCLC 722474576.
- Farina, Lorenzo; Rinaldi, Sergio (2011) [2000]. Positive Linear Systems: Theory and Applications. Wiley Interscience. ISBN 978-1-118-03127-8. OCLC 815646165.
- Berman, Abraham; Neumann, Michael; Stern, Ronald (1989). Nonnegative Matrices in Dynamical Systems. Pure and Applied Mathematics. Wiley Interscience. ISBN 0-471-62074-2. OCLC 1409010310.
- Kaczorek, Tadeusz (2002). Positive 1D and 2D Systems. Communications and Control Engineering. Springer. doi:10.1007/978-1-4471-0221-2. ISBN 978-1-4471-1097-2. OCLC 1050930884.
- Luenberger, David (1979). Introduction to Dynamic Systems: Theory, Modes & Applications. Wiley. pp. 204–6. ISBN 0-471-02594-1. OCLC 1422165904.
- Kemp, Murray C.; Kimura, Yoshio (1978). "§3.4 Matrices with the Minkowski or Metzler Property". Introduction to Mathematical Economics. Springer. pp. 102–114. ISBN 0-387-90304-6.
