= Nonnegative matrix =

Matrix with no negative elements

In mathematics, a nonnegative matrix, written

$$\mathbf{X} \geq 0,$$

is a matrix in which all the elements are equal to or greater than zero, that is,

$$x_{ij} \geq 0\qquad \forall {i,j}.$$

A positive matrix is a matrix in which all the elements are strictly greater than zero. The set of positive matrices is the interior of the set of all non-negative matrices. While such matrices are commonly found, the term "positive matrix" is only occasionally used due to the possible confusion with positive-definite matrices, which are different. A matrix which is both non-negative and is positive semidefinite is called a doubly non-negative matrix.

A rectangular non-negative matrix can be approximated by a decomposition with two other non-negative matrices via non-negative matrix factorization.

Eigenvalues and eigenvectors of square positive matrices are described by the Perron–Frobenius theorem.

== Properties ==
- The trace and every row and column sum/product of a nonnegative matrix is nonnegative.

== Inversion ==
The inverse of any non-singular M-matrix is a non-negative matrix. If the non-singular M-matrix is also symmetric then it is called a Stieltjes matrix.

The inverse of a non-negative matrix is usually not non-negative. The exception is the non-negative monomial matrices: a non-negative matrix has non-negative inverse if and only if it is a (non-negative) monomial matrix. Note that thus the inverse of a positive matrix is not positive or even non-negative, as positive matrices are not monomial, for dimension n > 1.

== Specializations ==
There are a number of groups of matrices that form specializations of non-negative matrices, e.g. stochastic matrix; doubly stochastic matrix; symmetric non-negative matrix.

== See also ==
- Metzler matrix

== Bibliography ==
- Berman, Abraham; Plemmons, Robert J. (1994). Nonnegative Matrices in the Mathematical Sciences. SIAM. doi:10.1137/1.9781611971262. ISBN 0-89871-321-8.
- Berman & Plemmons 1994, 2. Nonnegative Matrices pp. 26–62. doi:10.1137/1.9781611971262.ch2
- Horn, R.A.; Johnson, C.R. (2013). "8. Positive and nonnegative matrices". Matrix Analysis (2nd ed.). Cambridge University Press. ISBN 978-1-139-78203-6. OCLC 817562427.
- Krasnosel'skii, M. A. (1964). Positive Solutions of Operator Equations. Groningen: P. Noordhoff. OCLC 609079647.
- Krasnosel'skii, M. A.; Lifshits, Je.A.; Sobolev, A.V. (1990). Positive Linear Systems: The method of positive operators. Sigma Series in Applied Mathematics. Vol. 5. Helderman Verlag. ISBN 3-88538-405-1. OCLC 1409010096.
- Minc, Henryk (1988). Nonnegative matrices. Wiley. ISBN 0-471-83966-3. OCLC 1150971811.
- Seneta, E. (1981). Non-negative matrices and Markov chains. Springer Series in Statistics (2nd ed.). Springer. doi:10.1007/0-387-32792-4. ISBN 978-0-387-29765-1. OCLC 209916821.
- Varga, R.S. (2009). "Nonnegative Matrices". Matrix Iterative Analysis. Springer Series in Computational Mathematics. Vol. 27. Springer. pp. 31–62. doi:10.1007/978-3-642-05156-2_2. ISBN 978-3-642-05156-2.
- Andrzej Cichocki; Rafel Zdunek; Anh Huy Phan; Shun-ichi Amari: Nonnegative Matrix and Tensor Factorizations: Applications to Exploratory Multi-way Data Analysis and Blind Source Separation, John Wiley & Sons, ISBN 978-0-470-74666-0 (2009).
