= Alfred Klose =

German mathematician and astronomer (1895 - 1953)

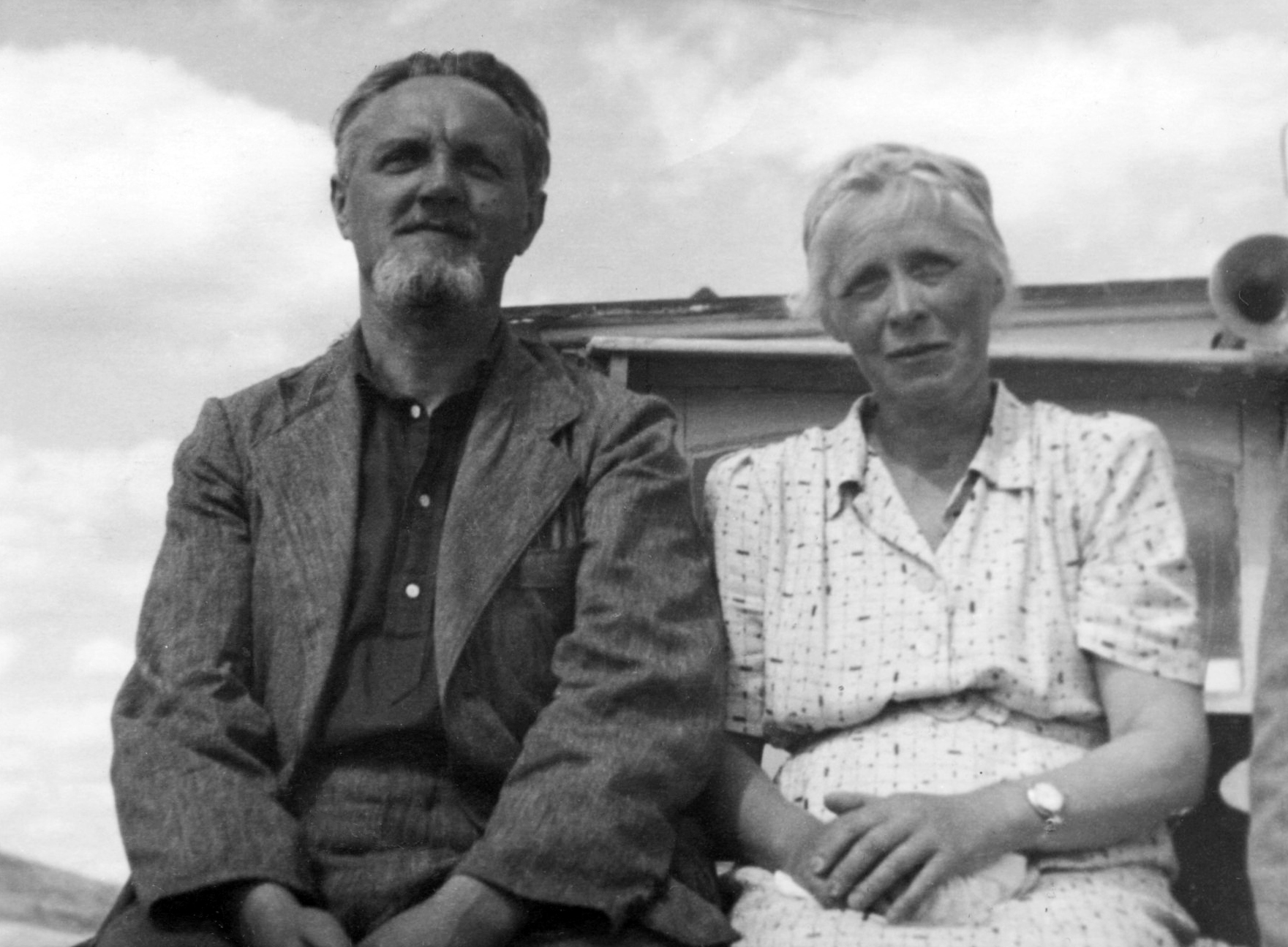
Alfred Klose and wife, 1948

Wilhelm Rudolf Alfred Klose (September 19, 1895 in Görlitz – February 21, 1953 in Potsdam) was a German applied mathematician and astronomer.

== Education and career ==
Klose studied at University of Breslau and University of Göttingen from 1916 and was an assistant at the observatory in Breslau from 1917. He received his doctorate in astronomy in 1921 in Breslau under Alexander Wilkens (research on the movement of the planet 189 Phthia). After that he was at the University of Greifswald and its observatory, where he habilitated in 1922 and became a privatdozent. In 1923 he habilitated at the Humboldt University of Berlin. In 1924 he became an associate professor of mechanics and theoretical astronomy at University of Latvia in Riga. In 1929 he became an associate professor of astronomy at Humboldt University of Berlin and, after Hilda Geiringer left in 1933, succeeded her as assistant to Theodor Vahlen at the Institute for Applied Mathematics. As an assistant he deputized for Vahlen, who took up a position at the Ministry of Education from 1933 and concentrated on his work there, but had succeeded the expelled Richard von Mises in 1934. In 1937 he became a full professor of applied mathematics and director of the institute. Actually, he had been classified as unsuitable because of his specialization in astronomy. The positive classification by Ludwig Bieberbach and Theodor Vahlen played a role in this – Klose was an active National Socialist. The institute went into decline and even in the Second World War no war-related work was done there - instead, Klose and two assistants were drafted. He was the laboratory manager of a test center of the Army Weapons Office for rocket tests in Gottow and at the Kummersdorf firing range near Luckenwalde. On the other hand, one of his assistants, Karl-Heinz Boseck (exempt from military service due to illness), had a great influence on the mathematics faculty as a former student leader, member of the SS (he set up a department for numerical computing in the Sachsenhausen concentration camp) and fanatical National Socialist of the Second World War.

In 1939, Klose was also in talks about the successor to Constantin Caratheodory in Munich (like Karl Strubecker, among others), which, despite positive reports from Vahlen and Bieberbach (who spoke out in favor of staying in Berlin), resulted in negative assessments by Oskar Peron failed. He obtained expert opinions from Ludwig Prandtl and Friedrich Pfeiffer, who were of the opinion that Klose was a particularly unsuspecting ignoramus in the field of applied mathematics.

In 1945/46 he was at the successor company of GEMA in Köpenick and from 1946 to 1952 (Operation Ossawakim) as one of the German scientists conscripted into service in the Soviet Union. He was sent to Gorodomlija near Ostashkov along with 169 German rocket scientists and engineers, including Helmut Gröttrup and Fritz Karl Preikschat. In 1952/53 he was a full professor of applied mathematics at the University of Rostock and was commissioned to set up an aeronautical engineering faculty, which only existed there for a short time.

Lothar Collatz was one of his doctoral students, but he was the last student of Richard von Mises to complete his work under him and in 1933 he passed the state examination privately with him.

In 1936, Klose was one of the editors of the journal German Mathematics.
