= Bramble–Hilbert lemma =

In mathematics, particularly numerical analysis, the Bramble–Hilbert lemma, named after James H. Bramble and Stephen Hilbert, bounds the error of an approximation of a function $\textstyle u$ by a polynomial of order at most $\textstyle m-1$ in terms of derivatives of $\textstyle u$ of order $\textstyle m$. Both the error of the approximation and the derivatives of $\textstyle u$ are measured by $\textstyle L^{p}$ norms on a bounded domain in $\textstyle \mathbb{R}^{n}$. This is similar to classical numerical analysis, where, for example, the error of linear interpolation $\textstyle u$ can be bounded using the second derivative of $\textstyle u$. However, the Bramble–Hilbert lemma applies in any number of dimensions, not just one dimension, and the approximation error and the derivatives of $\textstyle u$ are measured by more general norms involving averages, not just the maximum norm.

Additional assumptions on the domain are needed for the Bramble–Hilbert lemma to hold. Essentially, the boundary of the domain must be "reasonable". For example, domains that have a spike or a slit with zero angle at the tip are excluded. Lipschitz domains are reasonable enough, which includes convex domains and domains with continuously differentiable boundary.

The main use of the Bramble–Hilbert lemma is to prove bounds on the error of interpolation of function $\textstyle u$ by an operator that preserves polynomials of order up to $\textstyle m-1$, in terms of the derivatives of $\textstyle u$ of order $\textstyle m$. This is an essential step in error estimates for the finite element method. The Bramble–Hilbert lemma is applied there on the domain consisting of one element (or, in some superconvergence results, a small number of elements).

== The one-dimensional case ==
Before stating the lemma in full generality, it is useful to look at some simple special cases. In one dimension and for a function $\textstyle u$ that has $\textstyle m$ derivatives on interval $\textstyle \left( a,b\right)$, the lemma reduces to

$$\inf_{v\in P_{m-1}}\bigl\Vert u^{\left(  k\right)  }-v^{\left(  k\right) }\bigr\Vert_{L^{p}\left(  a,b\right)  }\leq C\left(  m,k\right)  \left( b-a\right)  ^{m-k}\bigl\Vert u^{\left(  m\right)  }\bigr\Vert_{L^{p}\left( a,b\right)  }\text{ for each integer }k\leq m\text{ and extended real }p\geq1,$$

where $\textstyle P_{m-1}$ is the space of all polynomials of degree at most $\textstyle m-1$ and $f^{(k)}$ indicates the $k$th derivative of a function $f$.

In the case when $\textstyle p=\infty$, $\textstyle m=2$, $\textstyle k=0$, and $\textstyle u$ is twice differentiable, this means that there exists a polynomial $\textstyle v$ of degree one such that for all $\textstyle x\in\left( a,b\right)$,

$$\left\vert u\left(  x\right)  -v\left(  x\right)  \right\vert \leq C\left( b-a\right)  ^{2}\sup_{\left(  a,b\right)  }\left\vert u^{\prime\prime }\right\vert.$$

This inequality also follows from the well-known error estimate for linear interpolation by choosing $\textstyle v$ as the linear interpolant of $\textstyle u$.

== Statement of the lemma ==
Suppose $\textstyle \Omega$ is a bounded domain in $\textstyle \mathbb{R}^n$, $\textstyle n\geq1$, with boundary $\textstyle \partial\Omega$ and diameter $\textstyle d$. $\textstyle W_p^k(\Omega)$ is the Sobolev space of all function $\textstyle u$ on $\textstyle \Omega$ with weak derivatives $\textstyle D^\alpha u$ of order $\textstyle \left\vert \alpha\right\vert$ up to $\textstyle k$ in $\textstyle L^p(\Omega)$. Here, $\textstyle \alpha=\left( \alpha_1,\alpha_2,\ldots,\alpha_n\right)$ is a multiindex, $\textstyle \left\vert \alpha\right\vert =$ $\textstyle \alpha_1+\alpha_2+\cdots+\alpha_n$ and $\textstyle D^\alpha$ denotes the derivative $\textstyle \alpha_1$ times with respect to $\textstyle x_1$, $\textstyle \alpha_2$ times with respect to $\textstyle x_2$, and so on. The Sobolev seminorm on $\textstyle W_p^m(\Omega)$ consists of the $\textstyle L^p$ norms of the highest order derivatives,

$$\left\vert u\right\vert _{W_p^m(\Omega)}=\left(  \sum_{\left\vert \alpha\right\vert =m}\left\Vert D^\alpha  u\right\Vert_{L^p(\Omega)}^p\right)  ^{1/p}\text{ if }1\leq p<\infty$$

and

$$\left\vert u\right\vert _{W_\infty^{m}(\Omega)}=\max_{\left\vert \alpha\right\vert =m}\left\Vert D^{\alpha}u\right\Vert _{L^\infty(\Omega)}$$

$\textstyle P_k$ is the space of all polynomials of order up to $\textstyle k$ on $\textstyle \mathbb{R}^n$. Note that $\textstyle D^{\alpha}v=0$ for all $\textstyle v\in P_{m-1}$ and $\textstyle \left\vert \alpha\right\vert =m$, so $\textstyle \left\vert u+v\right\vert _{W_p^m(\Omega)}$ has the same value for any $\textstyle v\in P_{m-1}$.

Lemma (Bramble and Hilbert) Under additional assumptions on the domain $\textstyle \Omega$, specified below, there exists a constant $\textstyle C=C\left( m,\Omega\right)$ independent of $\textstyle p$ and $\textstyle u$ such that for any $\textstyle u\in W_p^m(\Omega)$ there exists a polynomial $\textstyle v\in P_{m-1}$ such that for all $\textstyle k=0,\ldots,m,$

$$\left\vert u-v\right\vert _{W_p^k(\Omega)}\leq Cd^{m-k}\left\vert u\right\vert _{W_p^m(\Omega)}.$$

== The original result ==
The lemma was proved by Bramble and Hilbert under the assumption that $\textstyle \Omega$ satisfies the strong cone property; that is, there exists a finite open covering $\textstyle \left\{ O_{i}\right\}$ of $\textstyle \partial\Omega$ and corresponding cones $\textstyle \{C_{i}\}$ with vertices at the origin such that $\textstyle x+C_{i}$ is contained in $\textstyle \Omega$ for any $\textstyle x$ $\textstyle \in\Omega\cap O_{i}$.

The statement of the lemma here is a simple rewriting of the right-hand inequality stated in Theorem 1 in. The actual statement in is that the norm of the factorspace $\textstyle W_{p}^{m}(\Omega)/P_{m-1}$ is equivalent to the $\textstyle W_{p}^{m}(\Omega)$ seminorm. The $\textstyle W_{p}^{m}(\Omega)$ norm is not the usual one but the terms are scaled with $\textstyle d$ so that the right-hand inequality in the equivalence of the seminorms comes out exactly as in the statement here.

In the original result, the choice of the polynomial is not specified, and the value of constant and its dependence on the domain $\textstyle \Omega$ cannot be determined from the proof.

== A constructive form ==
An alternative result was given by Dupont and Scott under the assumption that the domain $\textstyle \Omega$ is star-shaped; that is, there exists a ball $\textstyle B$ such that for any $\textstyle x\in\Omega$, the closed convex hull of $\textstyle \left\{ x\right\} \cup B$ is a subset of $\textstyle \Omega$. Suppose that $\textstyle \rho _\max$ is the supremum of the diameters of such balls. The ratio $\textstyle \gamma=d/\rho_\max$ is called the chunkiness of $\textstyle \Omega$.

Then the lemma holds with the constant $\textstyle C=C\left( m,n,\gamma\right)$, that is, the constant depends on the domain $\textstyle \Omega$ only through its chunkiness $\textstyle \gamma$ and the dimension of the space $\textstyle n$. In addition, $v$ can be chosen as $v=Q^m u$, where $\textstyle Q^m u(x)$ is the averaged Taylor polynomial in $x$ at $B$, defined for $u\in W^{m-1,p}(\Omega)$ as

$$Q^{m}u(x)=\int_B T_y^mu\left(  x\right)  \psi\left(  y\right) \operatorname dy,$$

where $T_y^m$ is the

$$T_y^m u\left(  x\right)  =\sum\limits_{k=0}^{m-1}\sum\limits_{\left\vert \alpha\right\vert =k}\frac{1}{\alpha!}D^\alpha u\left(  y\right)  \left( x-y\right)^\alpha$$

$u$'s classical Taylor polynomial of order $\textstyle m-1$ in $\textstyle x$ centered at and defined for almost all $y$. The function $\textstyle \psi\geq0$ is a smooth mollifier function that has derivatives of all orders, equals to zero outside of $\textstyle B$, and such that

$$\int_B\psi(y) \operatorname dy=1.$$

Such function $\textstyle \psi$ always exists. Working out the integral, and thanks to the smoothness of $u$ and integration by parts, we obtain the following alternative forms

$$\begin{aligned}
Q^m u(x)&=
\sum\limits_{\vert\alpha\vert<m}\sum\limits_{\gamma+\beta=\alpha}
\frac1{\alpha!}a_{\gamma,\beta}x^\gamma\int_B D^\alpha u(y)y^\beta\psi(y)\operatorname dy
\\
&=
\sum_{|\alpha|<m}\sum_{\gamma+\beta}
\frac{(-1)^{\vert\alpha\vert}}{\alpha!}
a_{\gamma,\beta}x^\gamma
\int_B u(y)D^\alpha\left[y^\beta\psi(y)\right]
\operatorname dy
.
\end{aligned}$$

The latter form allows relaxing of the smoothness requirements on $u$ from being a member of $W^{m-1,p}$ to that of merely being a member of $L^1(\Omega)$. While the ATP is not a pointwise construction like the classical TP it is nonetheless local to the ball $B$ and it may be repeated as needed.

For more details and a tutorial treatment, see the monograph by Brenner and Scott. The result can be extended to the case when the domain $\textstyle \Omega$ is the union of a finite number of star-shaped domains, which is slightly more general than the strong cone property, and other polynomial spaces than the space of all polynomials up to a given degree.

== Bound on linear functionals ==
This result follows immediately from the above lemma, and it is also called sometimes the Bramble–Hilbert lemma, for example by Ciarlet. It is essentially Theorem 2 from.

Lemma Suppose that $\textstyle \ell$ is a continuous linear functional on $\textstyle W_{p}^{m}(\Omega)$ and $\textstyle \left\Vert \ell\right\Vert _{W_{p}^{m}(\Omega )^{^{\prime}}}$ its dual norm. Suppose that $\textstyle \ell\left( v\right) =0$ for all $\textstyle v\in P_{m-1}$. Then there exists a constant $\textstyle C=C\left( \Omega\right)$ such that

$$\left\vert \ell\left(  u\right)  \right\vert \leq C\left\Vert \ell\right\Vert _{W_{p}^{m}(\Omega)^{^{\prime}}}\left\vert u\right\vert _{W_{p}^{m}(\Omega)}.$$
