= Frank Natterer =

German mathematician

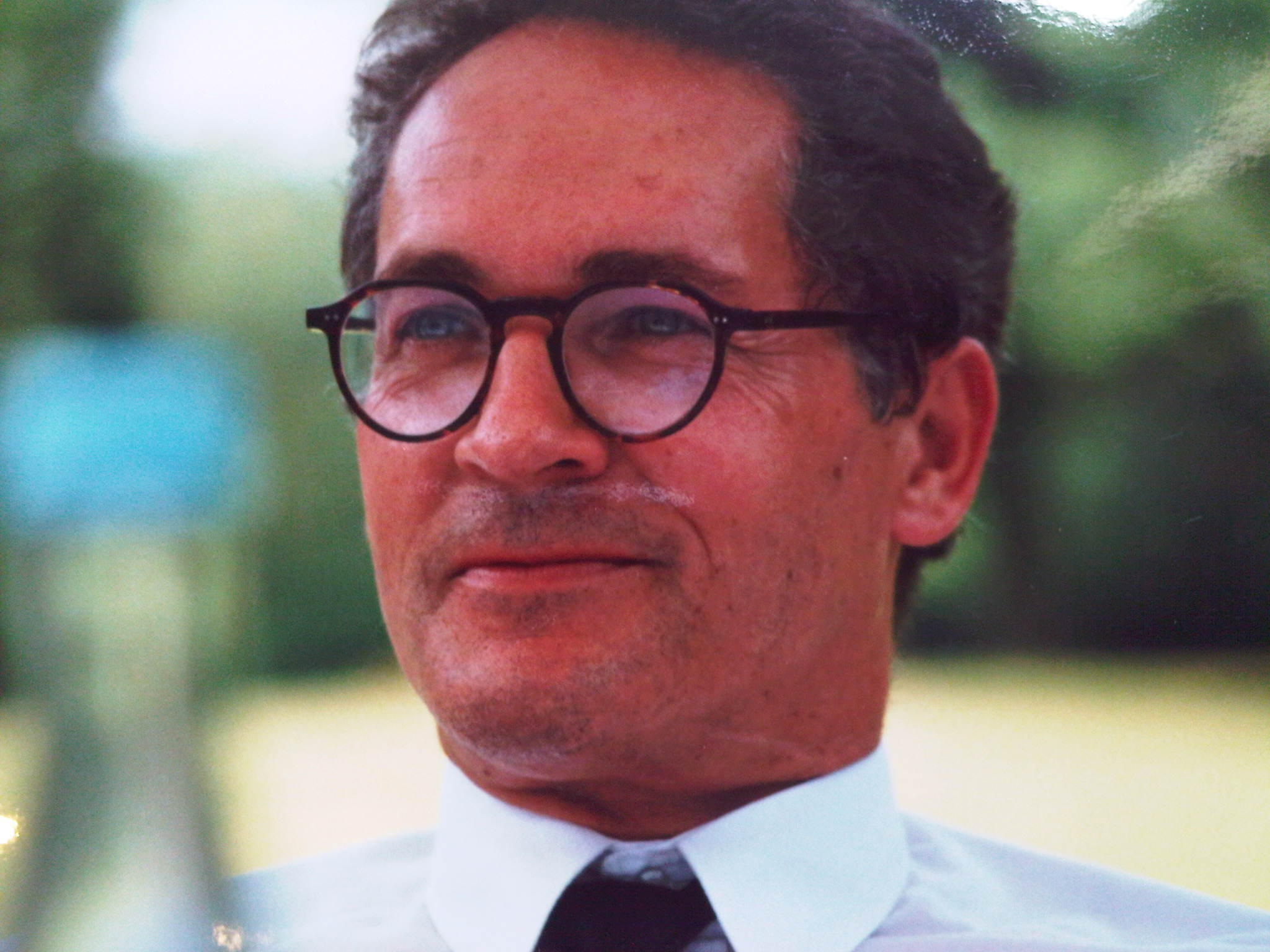
- Natterer in 2001
- Born: 20 July 1941 (age 85); Wangen im Allgäu, Germany
- Scientific career
- Fields: Mathematics
- Doctoral advisor: Lothar Collatz

Frank Natterer (20 July 1941) is a German mathematician. He was born in Wangen im Allgäu, Germany. Natterer pioneered and shaped the field of mathematical methods in imaging including computed tomography (CT), magnetic resonance imaging (MRI) and ultrasonic imaging and is considered a pioneer in the area of inverse problems .

== Career ==
After studies at the Universities of Freiburg and Hamburg Frank Natterer in 1968 earned his PhD with a thesis "Einschließungen für die großen Eigenwerte gewöhnlicher Differentialgleichungen zweiter und vierter Ordnung" under the supervision of Prof. Lothar Collatz. In 1971, he made the habilitation "Verallgemeinerte Splines und singuläre Rand-Eigenwertaufgaben gewöhnlicher Differentialgleichungen". Following a visiting assistant professorship at Indiana University Bloomington, Indiana (USA) he was full professor at the Universität des Saarlandes, Saarbrücken (Germany), from 1973-1981. He was Director of the "Institut für Numerische und instrumentelle Mathematik" of the Westfälische Wilhelms Universität, Münster, Germany, from 1981 until he retired from active teaching in 2006.

In 2002, he received an honorary doctorate at Universität des Saarlandes in recognition of his leading role and achievements in the field of mathematical methods in imaging and inverse problems.

He has published close to 100 scientific papers and two books and is in possession of numerous patents.

== Scientific work ==
In 1975, Natterer proved pointwise convergence of finite element methods. Starting in 1977, he focused on mathematical methods in computed tomography. In this field, he not only developed algorithms but also worked on tomographic scanners. His two books on this topic, "The Mathematics of Computerized Tomography" (1986, translated to Russian in 1990, new edition in 2001 in the series „Classics in Applied Mathematics"), and "Mathematical Methods in Image Reconstruction" (2001)) are considered standard works in this field of science. His main scientific contributions to the area of computed tomography are:

- Stability analysis of the Radon transformation in Sobolev spaces
- Consistency conditions for the exponential Radon transformation with applications in positron emission tomography
- Regularization of inverse problems with discretization and projection methods.
- sampling theorems (optimal resolution with minimal number of measurements) in tomography
- Fourier reconstruction
- Fast algorithms in ultrasonic tomography. In this field, he successfully regularized the classic example of Hadamard, the Cauchy problem for elliptic partial differential equations

Natterer’s scientific work has been very relevant in the development of modern methods of imaging in computed tomography (CT), magnetic resonance imaging (MRI), Ultrasonic Imaging and positron emission tomography (PET).

== Service to the scientific community ==
From 1995 to 1999, Natterer was the honorary editor of the journal Inverse Problems and since 2000 he has been a member of the "International Advisory Panel of Inverse Problems". Since 1997, he has been on the editorial board of The Journal of Fourier Analysis and Applications. He has also been involved with "IEEE Transactions on Medical Imaging", "Journal of Inverse and Ill-Posed Problems", "International Journal of Imaging Systems and Technology", and the SIAM Journal on Applied Mathematics.

He was member of the Committee on the Mathematics and Physics of Emerging Dynamic Biomedical Imaging of the National Research Council of the USA.

Natterer has organized numerous conferences on the topics of inverse problems and on the mathematical methods of computed tomography. In 1980, he founded the series of conferences "Mathematical Methods in Tomography“ at the Mathematical Research Institute of Oberwolfach. He was a faculty member in numerous scientific summer schools.

== Other work ==
Frank Natterer is a member of the German Proust Society and has published an article on Proust and mathematics.

== Personal life ==
He has been married to Renate Natterer since 1967. They have two adult sons. He is the father in law of Chinese pop star Karen Mok.
