= Q-matrix =

In mathematics, a Q-matrix is a square matrix whose associated linear complementarity problem LCP(M,q) has a solution for every vector q.

== Properties ==
- M is a Q-matrix if there exists d > 0 such that LCP(M,0) and LCP(M,d) have a unique solution.
- Any P-matrix is a Q-matrix. Conversely, if a matrix is a Z-matrix and a Q-matrix, then it is also a P-matrix.

== See also ==
- P-matrix
- Z-matrix
