= Karl-Heinz Boseck =

German mathematician

Karl-Heinz Boseck (born 11 December 1915) was a German mathematician.

According to Segal (2003), Boseck was a fanatical National Socialist and a student leader. He was an informer of the Gestapo since 1939. In 1944, shortly after his diploma graduation he was made an Untersturmführer of the Nazi SS and established a department for numerical computation in the Sachsenhausen concentration camp He was exempted from war service due to a disease. He was an assistant of the German mathematician Alfred Klose at Berlin University, and had great influence in the faculty during World War II. At the first mathematicians camp 1–3 July 1938 in the youth hostel of Ützdorf^{(de)} near Bernau, he lectured "On the development of student science work". He was department chairman for natural science at Berlin University, and had great influence on Ludwig Bieberbach who was leader of the "seminar" (may be institute); with course of time even more power shifted from Bieberbach to Boseck.
