= Semyon Aranovich Gershgorin =

Soviet mathematician (1901–1933)

Semyon Aronovich Gershgorin (Russian: Семён Аро́нович Гершго́рин; August 24, 1901 – May 30, 1933) was a Soviet (born in Pruzhany, Grodno Governorate, Russian Empire) mathematician. He began as a student at the Petrograd Technological Institute in 1923, became a professor in 1930, and was given an appointment at the Leningrad Mechanical Engineering Institute in the same year. His contributions include the Gershgorin circle theorem. He designed a device for constructing ellipses, a copy of which can be seen in the Deutsches Museum in Munich.

The spelling of S. A. Gershgorin's name (Семён Аронович Гершгорин) has been transliterated in several different ways, including Geršgorin, Gerschgorin, Gerszgorin, Gershgorin, Gershgeroff, Qureshin, Gershmachnow and from the Yiddish spelling הירשהאָרן to Hirshhorn and Hirschhorn.

The authors of his obituary wrote about Gershgorin's death at the very young age of 31: "A vigorous, stressful job weakened Semyon Aranovich's health; he succumbed to an accidental illness."
