= Lothar Collatz =

German mathematician (1910–1990)

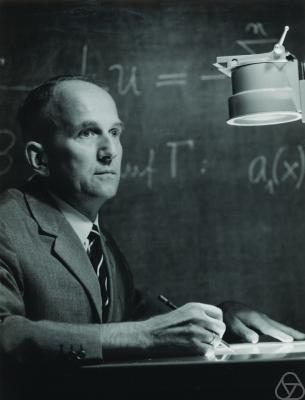
- Lothar Collatz
- Born: July 6, 1910; Arnsberg, Westphalia, German Empire
- Died: September 26, 1990 (aged 80); Varna, Bulgaria
- Education: University of Greifswald; University of Berlin
- Known for: Collatz conjecture Collatz–Wielandt formula Spectral graph theory
- Scientific career
- Fields: Mathematics
- Institutions: University of Berlin; Technische Hochschule Karlsruhe; Technische Universität Darmstadt; Technische Hochschule Hannover; University of Hamburg
- Doctoral advisor: Alfred Klose; Erhard Schmidt
- Doctoral students: Frank Natterer; Heinz Unger

Lothar Collatz (German: [ˈkɔlaʦ]; July 6, 1910 – September 26, 1990) was a German mathematician.

The "3x + 1" problem is also known as the Collatz conjecture and remains unsolved. The Collatz–Wielandt formula for the Perron–Frobenius eigenvalue of a positive square matrix was also named after him.

Collatz's 1957 paper with Ulrich Sinogowitz, who had been killed in the bombing of Darmstadt in World War II, founded the field of spectral graph theory.

== Biography ==
Collatz studied at universities in Germany including the University of Greifswald and the University of Berlin, where he was supervised by Alfred Klose, receiving his doctorate in 1935 for a dissertation entitled Das Differenzenverfahren mit höherer Approximation für lineare Differentialgleichungen (The finite difference method with higher approximation for linear differential equations). He then worked as an assistant at the University of Berlin, before moving to the Technische Hochschule Karlsruhe (now Karlsruhe Institute of Technology) in 1935 where he remained through 1937. From 1938 to 1943, he worked as a Privatdozent in Karlsruhe. In the war years he worked with Alwin Walther at the Institute for Practical Mathematics of the Technische Hochschule Darmstadt.

From 1943 to 1952, Collatz held a chair at the Technische Hochschule Hannover (now Leibniz University Hannover). From 1952 until his retirement in 1978, Collatz worked at the University of Hamburg, where he founded the Institute of Applied Mathematics in 1953. After retirement as professor emeritus, he continued to be very active at mathematical conferences.

For his many contributions to the field, Collatz had many honors bestowed upon him in his lifetime, including:

- election to the Academy of Sciences Leopoldina, the Academy of Sciences of the Institute of Bologna, and the Academy at Modena in Italy
- honorary member of the Hamburg Mathematical Society
- honorary degrees from the University of São Paulo, the Vienna University of Technology, the University of Dundee in Scotland, Brunel University in England, the University of Hannover in 1981, and the Technische Universität Dresden.

He died unexpectedly from a heart attack in Varna, Bulgaria, while attending a mathematics conference.

== Selected works ==
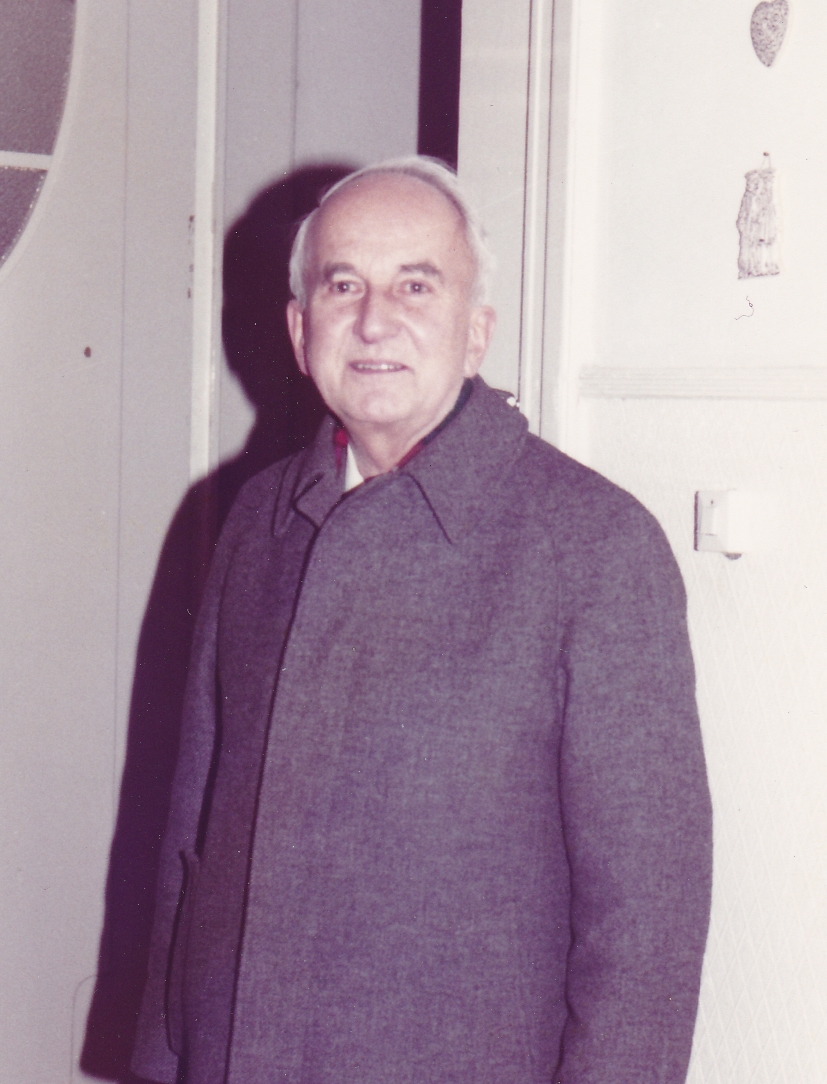
Lothar Collatz in 1984

- Das Differenzenverfahren mit höherer Approximation für lineare Differentialgleichungen (= Schriften des mathematischen Seminars und des Instituts für angewandte Mathematik der Universität Berlin – Band 3/Heft 1), Leipzig 1935
- Eigenwertprobleme und ihre numerische Behandlung. Leipzig 1945
- Eigenwertaufgaben mit technischen Anwendungen. Leipzig 1949, 1963
- Numerische Behandlung von Differentialgleichungen. Berlin 1951, 1955 (Eng. trans. 1966)
- Differentialgleichungen für Ingenieure. Stuttgart 1960
- with Wolfgang Wetterling: Optimierungsaufgaben Berlin 1966, 1971 (Eng. trans. 1975)
- Funktionalanalysis und Numerische Mathematik. Berlin 1964
- Differentialgleichungen. Eine Einführung unter besonderer Berücksichtigung der Anwendungen. Stuttgart, Teubner Verlag, 1966, 7th edn. 1990
- with Julius Albrecht: Aufgaben aus der angewandten Mathematik I. Gleichungen in einer und mehreren Variablen. Approximationen. Berlin 1972
- Numerische Methoden der Approximationstheorie. vol. 2. Vortragsauszüge der Tagung über Numerische Methoden der Approximationstheorie vom 3.-9. Juni 1973 im Mathematischen Forschungsinstitut Oberwolfach, Stuttgart 1975
- Approximationstheorie: Tschebyscheffsche Approximation und Anwendungen. Teubner 1973

== Sources ==
- Lothar Collatz (July 6, 1910 – September 26, 1990), Journal of Approximation Theory, vol. 65, issue 1, April 1991, page II by Günter Meinardus and Günther Nürnberger
- Collatz, Lothar (1942), "Einschließungssatz für die charakteristischen Zahlen von Matrizen", Mathematische Zeitschrift, 48 (1): 221–226, doi:10.1007/BF01180013, S2CID 120958677
