= James H. Bramble =

American mathematician (1930–2021)

- Born: December 1, 1930; Annapolis, Maryland
- Died: July 20, 2021 (aged 90)
- Known for: Bramble–Hilbert lemma

Academic background
- Education: Brown University; University of Maryland

Academic work
- Institutions: Cornell University; Texas A&M University

James Henry Bramble (December 1, 1930 – July 20, 2021) was an American mathematician known for his fundamental contributions in the development of the finite element methods, including the Bramble–Hilbert lemma, domain decomposition methods, and multigrid methods. During his career, he taught at Cornell University and Texas A&M University.

James Henry Bramble was born on December 1, 1930, in Annapolis, Maryland. He received his undergraduate degree at Brown University in 1953 and his Ph.D. from the University of Maryland in 1958. Bramble joined Cornell University in 1968, where he worked to develop analytical methods for partial differential equations. Between 1975 and 1981 he served as director of Cornell's Center for Applied Mathematics. From 1975 to 83, Bramble served as the chief editor for Mathematics of Computation.

Bramble retired from Cornell in 1994, later teaching at Texas A&M University.

Bramble received an honorary doctorate from the Chalmers University of Technology in 1985.

== See also ==
- Weakly chained diagonally dominant matrix
