= P-matrix =

Complex square matrix for which every principal minor is positive

In mathematics, a P-matrix is a complex square matrix with every principal minor is positive. A closely related class is that of $P_0$-matrices, which are the closure of the class of P-matrices, with every principal minor $\geq$ 0.

== Spectra of P-matrices ==
By a theorem of Kellogg, the eigenvalues of P- and $P_0$- matrices are bounded away from a wedge about the negative real axis as follows:

If $\{u_1,...,u_n\}$ are the eigenvalues of an n-dimensional P-matrix, where $n>1$, then

$$|\arg(u_i)| < \pi - \frac{\pi}{n},\ i = 1,...,n$$

If $\{u_1,...,u_n\}$, $u_i \neq 0$, $i = 1,...,n$ are the eigenvalues of an n-dimensional $P_0$-matrix, then

$$|\arg(u_i)| \leq \pi - \frac{\pi}{n},\ i = 1,...,n$$

== Remarks ==
The class of nonsingular M-matrices is a subset of the class of P-matrices. More precisely, all matrices that are both P-matrices and Z-matrices are nonsingular M-matrices. The class of sufficient matrices is another generalization of P-matrices.

The linear complementarity problem $\mathrm{LCP}(M,q)$ has a unique solution for every vector q if and only if M is a P-matrix. This implies that if M is a P-matrix, then M is a Q-matrix.

If the Jacobian of a function is a P-matrix, then the function is injective on any rectangular region of $\mathbb{R}^n$.

A related class of interest, particularly with reference to stability, is that of $P^{(-)}$-matrices, sometimes also referred to as $N-P$-matrices. A matrix A is a $P^{(-)}$-matrix if and only if $(-A)$ is a P-matrix (similarly for $P_0$-matrices). Since $\sigma(A) = -\sigma(-A)$, the eigenvalues of these matrices are bounded away from the positive real axis.

== See also ==
- Routh–Hurwitz matrix
- Linear complementarity problem
- M-matrix
- Q-matrix
- Z-matrix
- Perron–Frobenius theorem
