= Robert J. Plemmons =

American mathematician (1938–2026)

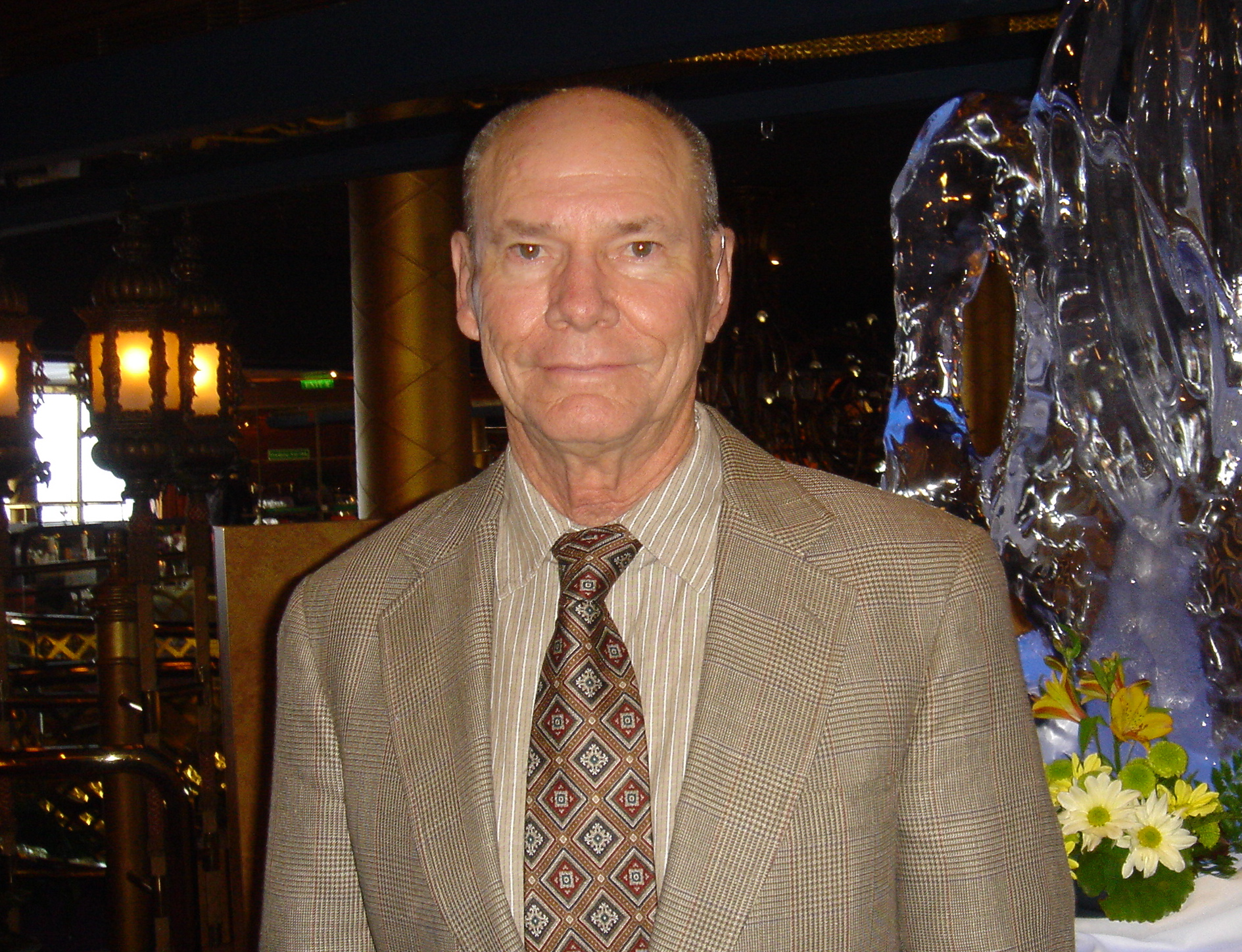
Plemmons in 2007

Robert James Plemmons (December 18, 1938 – February 6, 2026) was an American mathematician who specialized in computational mathematics. He was the emeritus Z. Smith Reynolds Professor of Mathematics and Computer Science at Wake Forest University. In 1979, Plemmons co-authored the book Nonnegative Matrices in the Mathematical Sciences.

== Early life and education ==
Plemmons was born on December 18, 1938, in the small town of Old Fort, North Carolina, and grew up in rural Appalachia. He attended Old Fort High School and graduated in 1957, having been the star athlete in both baseball and football.

He attended Wake Forest University (WFU) on a full baseball scholarship. Former athletic director Gene Hooks was his baseball coach. In 1959, he held the record for earned run average. During the years 1959–61, he held the record for victories, innings pitched, strikeouts, and complete games, and made All-Conference Pitcher all three years. In the academic year 1960–61, he was awarded the WFU ACC Scholar-Athlete of the Year. Plemmons graduated from Wake Forest in 1961 with a Bachelor of Science degree in mathematics.

During the early 1960s, Plemmons played professional baseball for four years with the Baltimore Orioles' minor league clubs. He played with the Tri-City Atoms, Aberdeen Pheasants, and Elmira Pioneers.

In December 1963, he married Mary Jo Harris, also from Old Fort and a graduate of Old Fort High School.

Plemmons attended graduate school at Auburn University from 1961 to 1965, receiving his PhD in applied mathematics in 1965. He then held research positions with Martin Marietta in Orlando, Florida, and the National Security Agency in Ft. Meade. He served as a faculty member at the University of Mississippi from 1966 to 1967, before moving to the University of Tennessee Knoxville in 1967. In 1981, Plemmons moved to Raleigh, North Carolina, where he taught at North Carolina State University until 1990. While there, he founded the University of North Carolina System's Center for Research in Scientific Computation. Plemmons joined the faculty of Wake Forest University in 1990. In 2013, he retired from teaching, but still conducted research at WFU. He was also the professor and mentor of former NBA and WFU basketball player Rusty LaRue.

== Academic work ==
Plemmons focused his work on applied computational mathematics. At Auburn in the early 1960s, Plemmons' work with PhD advisors Richard Ball and Emilie Haynsworth was focused on finite semigroups theory. He continued this research until the early 1980s at the University of Tennessee Knoxville. In 1979, he co-authored the book Nonnegative Matrices in the Mathematical Sciences along with Abraham Berman. The book has been cited over 7,500 times. In 1994, it was revised and republished by the Society for Industrial and Applied Mathematics (SIAM).

In the mid-to-late 1980s until mid-1990s, his research focused on numerical linear algebra, specifically in Matrix Theory with applications in Markov chains and nonnegative matrices. Plemmons has been recognized internationally for his significant contributions to the field, celebrated at the Linear Algebra: Theory, Applications, and Computations Conference held at Wake Forest University in 1999 in honor of Plemmons' 60th birthday, and the International Workshop on Numerical Linear Algebra with Applications held in Hong Kong in 2013 in honor of his 75th birthday.

Plemmons conducted research in imaging physics and applied optics at Wake Forest from the late 1990s. He focused initially in biometrics, including iris recognition. His later research was in space situational awareness, tracking space debris using optical methods to prevent damage to space assets.

Over the years, he received funding from the National Science Foundation, the National Security Agency, the Central Intelligence Agency, the North Atlantic Treaty Organization, the Air Force Office of Scientific Research, the Army Research Office, the Department of Energy, the Intelligence Advanced Research Projects Activity, and the National Geospatial-Intelligence Agency. His research was continuously funded by the Department of Defense from 1973.

In 1996, Plemmons delivered a congressional testimony to the U.S. House of Representatives Committee on National Security, in support of appropriations to the Department of Defense on behalf of the Joint Policy Board for Mathematics, including the American Mathematical Society and SIAM.

The mathematics lineage of Plemmons can be traced back to the German mathematicians in the 17th century. Among his peers, he was a Fellow of the Society for Industrial and Applied Mathematics.

He was the author of more than 250 publications on computational mathematics, and served on the editorial board of six journals.

== Death ==
Plemmons died from cancer at his home in Winston-Salem, North Carolina, on February 6, 2026, at the age of 87.

== Books ==
- Nonnegative Matrices in the Mathematical Sciences (1979), Academic Press, ISBN 1483260860
- Large scale matrix problems (1981), together with Åke Björck and Hans Schneider, North Holland, ISBN 0444005633
- Scientific Computing: Proceedings of the Workshop, 1997, Hong Kong (1997), edited with Gene H. Golub, Lui Shui-Hong, and T. Luk Franklin, Springer Science and Business Media, ISBN 9813083603
- Linear Algebra, Markov Chains, and Queueing Models (2012), edited with Carl D. Meyer, Springer Science and Business Media, ISBN 146138351X
