= Hurwitz-stable matrix =

Matrix whose eigenvalues have negative real part

In mathematics, a Hurwitz-stable matrix, or more commonly simply Hurwitz matrix, is a square matrix whose eigenvalues all have strictly negative real part. Some authors also use the term stability matrix. Such matrices play an important role in control theory.

== Definition ==
A square matrix $A$ is called a Hurwitz matrix if every eigenvalue of $A$ has strictly negative real part, that is,

$$\operatorname{Re}[\lambda_i] < 0\,$$

for each eigenvalue $\lambda_i$. $A$ is also called a stable matrix, because then the differential equation

$$\dot x = A x$$

is asymptotically stable, that is, $x(t)\to 0$ as $t\to\infty.$

If $G(s)$ is a (matrix-valued) transfer function, then $G$ is called Hurwitz if the poles of all elements of $G$ have negative real part. Note that it is not necessary that $G(s),$ for a specific argument $s,$ be a Hurwitz matrix — it need not even be square. The connection is that if $A$ is a Hurwitz matrix, then the dynamical system

$$\dot x(t)=A x(t) + B u(t)$$
$y(t)=C x(t) + D u(t)\,$

has a Hurwitz transfer function.

Any hyperbolic fixed point (or equilibrium point) of a continuous dynamical system is locally asymptotically stable if and only if the Jacobian of the dynamical system is Hurwitz stable at the fixed point.

The Hurwitz stability matrix is a crucial part of control theory. A system is stable if its control matrix is a Hurwitz matrix. The negative real components of the eigenvalues of the matrix represent negative feedback. Similarly, a system is inherently unstable if any of the eigenvalues have positive real components, representing positive feedback.

== See also ==
- M-matrix
- Perron–Frobenius theorem, which shows that any Hurwitz matrix must have at least one negative entry
- Z-matrix
