= L-matrix =

Matrix with positive entries on the main diagonal and non-positive entries elsewhere

In mathematics, the class of L-matrices are those matrices whose off-diagonal entries are less than or equal to zero and whose diagonal entries are positive; that is, an L-matrix L satisfies

$$L=(\ell_{ij});\quad \ell_{ii} > 0; \quad \ell_{ij}\leq 0, \quad i\neq j.$$

== See also ==
- Z-matrix—every L-matrix is a Z-matrix
- Metzler matrix—the negation of any L-matrix is a Metzler matrix
